Comcast provides cable television in and/or around the following locations (Partial list of franchises and communities served):
As the largest Cable television provider in the United States, Comcast claims over 21 million domestic customers and thousands of US cable television franchises.

Alabama (6)  

 Dothan
 Florence
 Gadsden
 Huntsville
 Mobile
 Tuscaloosa

Arizona (1)  

 Tucson

Arkansas (3)  

 Little Rock
 North Little Rock
 West Memphis

California (47)  

 Acampo
 Alameda
 Alamo
 Albany
 Albion
 Alviso
 Amador City
 American Canyon
 Angels Camp
 Angwin
 Antelope
 Antioch
 Aptos
 Arbuckle
 Armona
 Arnold
 Atherton
 Atwater
 Auburn
 Avery
 Ballard
 Bay Point
 Beale Afb
 Belmont
 Belvedere
 Belvedere Tiburon
 Ben Lomond
 Benicia
 Berkeley
 Bethel Island
 Biggs
 Biola
 Bodega
 Bodega Bay
 Boulder Creek
 Boyes Hot Springs
 Brentwood
 Brisbane
 Broadmoor Village
 Brookdale
 Buellton
 Burlingame
 Byron
 Calistoga
 Cameron Park
 Camino
 Camp Meeker
 Campbell
 Canyon
 Capitola
 Carmel
 Carmel By The Sea
 Carmel Valley
 Carmichael
 Caspar
 Castro Valley
 Castroville
 Cazadero
 Ceres
 Chico
 Chowchilla
 Citrus Heights
 Clayton
 Cloverdale
 Clovis
 Clyde
 Coalinga
 Colma
 Columbia
 Colusa
 Concord
 Cool
 Corcoran
 Corning
 Corte Madera
 Costa Mesa
 Cotati
 Crockett
 Crows Landing
 Cupertino
 Daly City
 Danville
 Davenport
 Davis
 Deer Park
 Del Rey
 Del Rey Oaks
 Diablo
 Diamond Springs
 Dinuba
 Discovery Bay
 Dos Palos
 Douglas Flat
 Dublin
 Duncans Mills
 Durham
 East Palo Alto
 El Cerrito
 El Dorado
 El Dorado Hills
 El Granada
 El Sobrante
 Elk Grove
 Elverta
 Emerald Hills
 Emeryville
 Escalon
 Fair Oaks
 Fairfax
 Fairfield
 Felton
 Firebaugh
 Folsom
 Forest Knolls
 Forestville
 Fort Bragg
 Foster City
 Fowler
 Freedom
 Fremont
 French Camp
 Fresno
 Friant
 Fulton
 Galt
 Georgetown
 Geyserville
 Glen Ellen
 Gold River
 Goshen
 Granite Bay
 Grass Valley
 Graton
 Greenbrae
 Gridley
 Guerneville
 Gustine
 Half Moon Bay
 Hamilton City
 Hanford
 Hathaway Pines
 Hayward
 Healdsburg
 Hercules
 Hillsborough
 Hilmar
 Hughson
 Huron
 Isleton
 Jackson
 Jamestown
 Kensington
 Kentfield
 Kenwood
 Kerman
 Kingsburg
 Knightsen
 La Honda
 La Selva Beach
 Lafayette
 Lagunitas
 Larkspur
 Lathrop
 Laton
 Le Grand
 Lemoore
 Lincoln
 Linda
 Linden
 Littleriver
 Live Oak
 Livermore
 Lockeford
 Lodi
 Loma Mar
 Lompoc
 Los Altos
 Los Altos Hills
 Los Banos
 Los Gatos
 Los Olivos
 Madera
 Magalia
 Manteca
 Marina
 Martinez
 Marysville
 Mather
 Maxwell
 Mcclellan
 Mendocino
 Mendota
 Menlo Park
 Merced
 Mi Wuk Village
 Mill Valley
 Millbrae
 Milpitas
 Mipitas
 Modesto
 Mokelumne Hill
 Montara
 Monte Rio
 Monte Sereno
 Monterey
 Moraga
 Morgan Hill
 Moss Beach
 Moss Landing
 Mount Hamilton
 Mount Hermon
 Mountain House
 Mountain View
 Muir Beach
 Murphys
 Napa
 Nevada City
 Newark
 Newcastle
 Newman
 North Highlands
 Novato
 Oakdale
 Oakland
 Oakley
 Occidental
 Olivehurst
 Orangevale
 Orcutt
 Orinda
 Orland
 Oroville
 Pacheco
 Pacific Grove
 Pacifica
 Palermo
 Palo Alto
 Paradise
 Parlier
 Patterson
 Pebble Beach
 Penn Valley
 Penngrove
 Pescadero
 Petaluma
 Piedmont
 Pinedale
 Pinole
 Pittsburg
 Placerville
 Planada
 Pleasant Hill
 Pleasanton
 Plumas Lake
 Plymouth
 Pollock Pines
 Pope Valley
 Port Costa
 Portola Valley
 Rancho Cordova
 Redwood City
 Redwood Valley
 Reedley
 Represa
 Rescue
 Richmond
 Rio Linda
 Rio Nido
 Rio Vista
 Riverbank
 Riverdale
 Rocklin
 Rodeo
 Rohnert Park
 Roseville
 Ross
 Rough And Ready
 Sacramento
 Saint Helena
 Salinas
 San Andreas
 San Anselmo
 San Carlos
 San Francisco
 San Geronimo
 San Joaquin
 San Jose
 San Leandro
 San Lorenzo
 San Mateo
 San Pablo
 San Quentin
 San Rafael
 San Ramon
 Sand City
 Sanger
 Santa Clara
 Santa Cruz
 Santa Maria
 Santa Nella
 Santa Rosa
 Santa Ynez
 Saratoga
 Sausalito
 Scotts Valley
 Seaside
 Sebastopol
 Selma
 Shingle Springs
 Solvang
 Sonoma
 Sonora
 Soquel
 Soulsbyville
 South San Francisco
 Spreckels
 Stanford
 Stockton
 Stratford
 Suisun City
 Sunnyvale
 Sunol
 Sutter
 Sutter Creek
 Tiburon
 Tracy
 Travis AFB
 Tulare
 Tuolumne
 Turlock
 Twain Harte
 Ukiah
 Union City
 Vacaville
 Valencia
 Vallejo
 Valley Ford
 Valley Springs
 Victor
 Visalia
 Wallace
 Walnut Creek
 Waterford
 Watsonville
 West Sacramento
 Wheatland
 Williams
 Willits
 Willows
 Wilton
 Windsor
 Winton
 Woodacre
 Woodbridge
 Woodland
 Woodside
 Yountville
 Yuba City

Colorado (320)  

 Arvada
 Aspen
 Aurora
 Avon
 Basalt
 Battlement Mesa
 Bennett
 Berthoud
 Boulder
 Breckenridge
 Brighton
 Broomfield
 Buena Vista
 Byers
 Canon City
 Carbondale
 Cascade
 Castle Pines
 Castle Rock
 Centennial
 Cherry Hill Village
 Cherry Hills
 Colorado Spring
 Colorado Springs
 Commerce City
 Conifer
 Dacono
 Denver
 Dillon
 Dumont
 Dupont
 Durango
 Eagle
 East Lake
 Eastlake
 Edgewater
 Edwards
 El Jebel
 Eldorado Springs
 Elizabeth
 Empire
 Englewood
 Erie
 Estes Park
 Evans
 Evergreen
 Federal Heights
 Firestone
 Fort Collins
 Fort Lupton
 Fountain
 Foxfield
 Franktown
 Fraser
 Frederick
 Frisco
 Ft. Collins
 Georgetown
 Glendale
 Glenwood Springs
 Golden
 Granby
 Grand Junction
 Grand Lake
 Greeley
 Green Mountain Falls
 Greenwood Village
 Henderson
 Highlands Ranch
 Hot Sulphur Spring
 Hot Sulphur Springs
 Hudson
 Idaho Springs
 Idledale
 Indian Hills
 Johnstown
 Keystone
 Kiowa
 Kittredge
 Kremmling
 La Salle
 Lafayette
 Lakewood
 Larkspur
 Littleton
 Lochbuie
 Lone Tree
 Longmont
 Louisville
 Louviers
 Loveland
 Manitou Springs
 Marble
 Minturn
 Montrose
 Monument
 Morrison
 New Castle
 Niwot
 Northglenn
 Palmer Lake
 Parachute
 Parker
 Peterson AFB
 Peyton
 Pueblo
 Pueblo West
 Rifle
 Sedalia
 Sheridan
 Silt
 Silver Plume
 Silverthorne
 Snowmass
 Snowmass Village
 Steamboat
 Steamboat Springs
 Strasburg
 Superior
 Tabernash
 Thornton
 Timnath
 Trinidad
 Usaf Academy
 Vail
 Wellington
 Westminster
 Wheat Ridge
 Windsor
 Winter Park
 Woodland Park
 Woody Creek

Connecticut (197)  

 Amston
 Andover
 Ansonia
 Avon
 Baltic
 Beacon Falls
 Berlin
 Bethany
 Bethel
 Bloomfield
 Bolton
 Bozrah
 Branford
 Bridgeport
 Bristol
 Broad Brook
 Brookfield
 Burlington
 Canaan
 Canton
 Canton Center
 Centerbrook
 Chaplin
 Cheshire
 Chester
 Clinton
 Cobalt
 Colchester
 Collinsville
 Columbia
 Coventry
 Cromwell
 Danbury
 Darien
 Deep River
 Derby
 Durham
 East Berlin
 East Canaan
 East Granby
 East Haddam
 East Hampton
 East Hartford
 East Haven
 East Lyme
 Easton
 Ellington
 Enfield
 Essex
 Fairfield
 Falls Village
 Farmington
 Forestville
 Franklin
 Gales Ferry
 Gilman
 Glastonbury
 Granby
 Greenwich
 Griswold
 Groton
 Guilford
 Haddam
 Haddam Neck
 Hadlyme
 Hamden
 Hanover
 Hartford
 Harwinton
 Hebron
 Higganum
 Huntington
 Ivoryton
 Jewett City
 Kensington
 Killingworth
 Lakeville
 Lebanon
 Ledyard
 Lisbon
 Litchfield
 Lyme
 Madison
 Manchester
 Marlborough
 Mashantucket
 Meriden
 Middle Haddam
 Middlebury
 Middlefield
 Middletown
 Milford
 Monroe
 Moodus
 Mystic
 Naugatuck
 New Britain
 New Canaan
 New Fairfield
 New Hartford
 New Haven
 New London
 New Milford
 Newington
 Newtown
 Niantic
 Noank
 Norfolk
 North Branford
 North Canaan
 North Canton
 North Franklin
 North Haven
 North Stonington
 Northford
 Norwalk
 Norwich
 Oakville
 Old Lyme
 Old Mystic
 Old Saybrook
 Orange
 Oxford
 Pawcatuck
 Pequabuck
 Plainville
 Plantsville
 Plymouth
 Poquonock
 Portland
 Preston
 Prospect
 Redding
 Ridgefield
 Riverside
 Rockfall
 Rockville
 Rocky Hill
 Salem
 Salisbury
 Sandy Hook
 Seymour
 Sharon
 Shelton
 Simsbury
 Somers
 South Lyme
 South Windsor
 Southbury
 Southington
 Southport
 Sprague
 Stamford
 Stonington
 Storrs
 Stratford
 Suffield
 Taconic
 Taftville
 Tariffville
 Terryville
 Thomaston
 Tolland
 Torrington
 Trumbull
 Uncasville
 Unionville
 Vernon
 Vernon Rockville
 Versailles
 Voluntown
 Wallingford
 Waterbury
 Waterford
 Watertown
 Weathersfield
 Weatogue
 West Cornwall
 West Hartford
 West Haven
 West Redding
 West Simsbury
 Westbrook
 Weston
 Westport
 Wethersfield
 Whitneyville
 Willimantic
 Wilton
 Windsor
 Windsor Locks
 Winsted
 Wolcott
 Woodbridge
 Woodbury
 Yalesville
 Yantic

Delaware (62)  

 Bear
 Bethany Beach
 Bethel
 Blades
 Bridgeville
 Camden
 Camden Wyoming
 Cheswold
 Claymont
 Clayton
 Clermont
 Dagsboro
 Delmar
 Dewey Beach
 Dover
 Edgemoor
 Ellendale
 Elsmere
 Farmington
 Felton
 Fenwick Island
 Frankford
 Frederica
 Georgetown
 Greenville
 Greenwood
 Harbeson
 Harrington
 Hartly
 Hockessin
 Houston
 Kenton
 Laurel
 Leipsic
 Lewes
 Lincoln
 Little Creek
 Magnolia
 Marydel
 Middletown
 Milford
 Millsboro
 Milton
 Montchanin
 Nassau
 New Castle
 Newark
 Newport
 Ocean View
 Rehoboth Beach
 Rockland
 Saint Georges
 Seaford
 Selbyville
 Smyrna
 Townsend
 Viola
 Wilmington
 Winterthur
 Woodside
 Wyoming
 Yorklyn

District of Columbia (3)  

 Fort McNair
 Washington
 Washington Navy Yard

Florida (500)  

 Alachua
 Alford
 Altamonte Springs
 Altha
 Alturas
 Alva
 Amelia Island
 Apollo Beach
 Apopka
 Aqualine Shores
 Arcadia
 Archer
 Atlantic Beach
 Atlantis
 Auburndale
 Ave Maria
 Aventura
 Avon Park
 Babson Park
 Baldwin
 Baldwin Park
 Banyan Estates
 Bartow
 Bascom
 Bay Hill
 Bayard
 Beachaven
 Beauclerc Gardens
 Belle Glade
 Belleview
 Beverly Hills
 Big Pine Key
 Biggar
 Biscayne Park
 Boca Grande
 Boca Raton
 Bokeelia
 Bonifay
 Bonita Springs
 Bowling Green
 Boynton Beach
 Bradenton
 Brandon
 Briarcliff Rd
 Brooksville
 Bryant Village
 Bryceville
 Buckingham
 Callahan
 Canal Point
 Candler
 Cape Coral
 Captiva
 Carol City
 Casselberry
 Celebration
 Central Naples
 Central Park
 Chipley
 Chokoloskee
 City Center
 Clearwater
 Clermont
 Clewiston
 Cocoa
 Cocoa Beach
 Coconut Creek
 Coconut Grove
 College Park
 Cooper City
 Coquina Sands
 Coral Gables
 Cottondale
 Crawfordville
 Crescent City
 Crestview
 Crystal River
 Cudjoe Key
 Cutler Bay
 Cypress
 Dade City
 Dania
 Dania Beach
 Davenport
 Davie
 Daytona Beach
 DeBary
 Deerfield Beach
 Deerwood Club
 DeLand
 Delray Beach
 Deltona
 Destin
 Doctor Phillips
 Doral
 Dover
 Dunedin
 Dunnellon
 Earleton
 East Hampton
 East Palatka
 Eastlake Weir
 Edgewater
 El Cid
 El Portal
 Elkton
 Ellenton
 Englewood
 Enterprise
 Estate Section
 Estero
 Eustis
 Everglades City
 Fellsmere
 Fernandina
 Fernandina Beach
 Ferndale
 Fisher Island
 Flagler Beach
 Flamingo Park
 Fleming Island
 Floral City
 Florida City
 Fort Denaud
 Fort Lauderdale
 Fort Meade
 Fort Myers
 Fort Myers Beach
 Fort Pierce
 Fort White
 Frostproof
 Fruit Cove
 Fruitland Park
 Ft Lauderdale
 Ft Myers Beach
 Gainesville
 Georgetown
 Glen Ridge
 Glen Saint Mary
 Glen St Mary
 Goodland
 Gotha
 Grand Island
 Grand Ridge
 Grandview Heights
 Grant
 Grassy Key
 Green Acres
 Green Cove Springs
 Greenacres
 Greenfield
 Greenland
 Greenwood
 Groveland
 Gulf Breeze
 Gulf Shore Blvd
 Haines City
 Hallandale
 Hallandale Beach
 Hastings
 Havana
 Haverhill
 Hernando
 Hialeah
 Hialeah Gardens
 Highland Beach
 Hilliard
 Hillsboro Beach
 Hobe Sound
 Holder
 Holiday
 Hollister
 Hollywood
 Holmes Beach
 Homeland
 Homestead
 Homosassa
 Howey In The Hills
 Hudson
 Hunters Creek
 Hypoluxo
 Ibis
 Immokalee
 Indiantown
 Inglis
 Intercession City
 Interlachen
 Inverness
 Iona
 Islamorada
 Jacksonville
 Jacksonville Beach
 Jacksonville Nas
 Jasper
 Jax
 Jennings
 Jensen Beach
 Juno Beach
 Jupiter
 Kendall
 Key Biscayne
 Key Colony Beach
 Key Largo
 Key West
 Keystone Heights
 Labelle
 Lady Lake
 Lake Butler
 Lake Cain Hills
 Lake City
 Lake Como
 Lake Eola Heights
 Lake Geneva
 Lake Mary
 Lake Nona
 Lake Park
 Lake Placid
 Lake Suzy
 Lake Wales
 Lake Worth
 Lakeland
 Lakewood Ranch
 Lantana
 Largo
 Laud By Sea
 Lauderdale By The Sea
 Lauderdale Lakes
 Lauderhill
 Laurel
 Lazy Lake
 Lecanto
 Leesburg
 Lehigh
 Lehigh Acres
 Lighthouse Point
 Lithia
 Live Oak
 Long Key
 Longboat Key
 Longwood
 Lorida
 Loxahatchee
 Lutz
 Lynn Haven
 Macclenny
 Madison
 Maitland
 Malone
 Maples
 Marathon
 Marathon Shores
 Marco Island
 Margate
 Marianna
 Mary Esther
 Matacha Isles
 Matlacha
 Matlacha Isles
 Maxville
 Mayo
 Mayport
 Mayport Nas
 Mayport Naval Sta
 Mayport Navy
 Mcgregor
 Medley
 Melbourne
 Melrose
 Merritt Island
 Miami
 Miami Beach
 Miami Gardens
 Miami Lakes
 Miami Shores
 Miami Springs
 Middleburg
 Midway
 Milton
 Mims
 Minneola
 Miramar
 Miromar Lakes
 Monticello
 Montverde
 Moore Haven
 Moorings
 Mount Dora
 Mt Plymouth
 Mulberry
 Murdock
 N Ft Myers
 N Palm Beach
 Naples
 Naranja
 Nas Jacksonvle
 Nas Jax
 Navarre
 Neptune Beach
 New Port Richey
 New Smyrna Beach
 Niceville
 Nocatee
 Nokomis
 Noma
 North End
 North Fort Myers
 North Ft Myers
 North Lauderdale
 North Miami
 North Miami Beach
 North Palm Beach
 North Port
 Oakland Park
 Ocala
 Ocean Ridge
 Ocklawaha
 Ocoee
 Odessa
 Okahumpka
 Okeechobee
 Oldsmar
 Opa Locka
 Orange City
 Orange Park
 Orlando
 Ormond Beach
 Ortega
 Ortega Forrest
 Osprey
 Oviedo
 Oxford
 Pace
 Pahokee
 Palatka
 Palm Bay
 Palm Beach
 Palm Beach Garden
 Palm Beach Gardens
 Palm City
 Palm Coast
 Palm Harbor
 Palm Springs
 Palmetto
 Palmetto Bay
 Panacea
 Panama City
 Panama City Beach
 Park Shore
 Parkland
 Parramore
 Parrish
 Pelican Bay
 Pembroke Park
 Pembroke Pines
 Pembroke Pnes
 Pensacola
 Perrine
 Perry
 Pine Hills
 Pinecrest
 Pineland
 Pinellas Park
 Pinetta
 Placida
 Plant City
 Plantation
 Pomona Park
 Pompano Beach
 Ponte Vedra
 Ponte Vedra Beach
 Port Charlotte
 Port Orange
 Port Richey
 Port Royal
 Port Saint Lucie
 Port Salerno
 Port St Lucie
 Princeton
 Punta Gorda
 Quincy
 Regent Park
 Riverview
 Riviera Beach
 Rockledge
 Roseland
 Rotonda
 Rotonda West
 Royal Harbor
 Royal Palm Beach
 Ruskin
 Saint Augustine
 Saint Cloud
 Saint Johns
 Saint Marks
 San Marco
 San Mateo
 Sand Lake
 Sanderson
 Sanford
 Sanibel
 Sarasota
 Satsuma
 Scottsmoor
 Sea Ranch Lakes
 Sebastian
 Sebring
 Seffner
 Seminole
 Silver Springs
 Singer Island
 Sneads
 Sopchoppy
 Sorrento
 South Bay
 South Eola
 South Miami
 South Riverside
 Southland Park
 Southport
 Southwest Ranches
 Spring Hill
 Spring Lake
 St Augustine
 St Augustine Beach
 St Cloud
 St James City
 St Johns
 St Petersburg
 St. Cloud
 Starke
 Stock Island
 Stuart
 Sugarloaf
 Sugarloaf Key
 Sugarloaf Shrs
 Summerfield
 Summerland Key
 Sun City Center
 Sun Terrace
 Sunny Isles Beach
 Sunrise
 Sunshine Park
 Surfside
 Sweetwater
 Switzerland
 Tallahassee
 Tamarac
 Tampa
 Tarpon Springs
 Tavares
 Tavernier
 Temple Terrace
 Tequesta
 The Villages
 Thonotosassa
 Thornton Park
 Titusville
 Trenton
 Umatilla
 University Park
 Valrico
 Vanderbilt Beach
 Venice
 Vero Beach
 Virginia Gardens
 Wabasso
 Waldo
 Wauchula
 Weirsdale
 Wekiva Springs
 Welaka
 Wellington
 Wellington View
 Wesley Chapel
 West Miami
 West Palm Beach
 West Park
 Weston
 White Springs
 Wildwood
 Williston
 Wilton Manors
 Windermere
 Winter Garden
 Winter Haven
 Winter Park
 Winter Springs
 Winterhaven
 Woodville
 Worth Avenue
 Wpb
 Yalaha
 Yankeetown
 Youngstown
 Yulee
 Zephyrhills
 Zolfo Springs

Georgia (347)  

 Acworth
 Adairsville
 Adrian
 Ailey
 Alamo
 Albany
 Allenhurst
 Alpharetta
 Ansley Park
 Ansley Park
 Appling
 Aragon
 Ardmore Gould Estates
 Argyle
 Arlington
 Armuchee
 Athens
 Atlanta
 Auburn
 Augusta
 Austell
 Avondale Estates
 Ball Ground
 Bartow
 Baxley
 Bellville
 Berkeley Lake
 Bethlehem
 Bingville
 Blackshear
 Blairsville
 Blitchton
 Bloomingdale
 Blythe
 Bogart
 Bowdon
 Bowdon Junction
 Bowman
 Braselton
 Bremen
 Briarmoor Manor
 Briarmoor Manor
 Bridgemill
 Brookhaven
 Brookhaven
 Brooks
 Brookwood Hills
 Brookwood Hills
 Brunswick
 Buckhead
 Buckhead
 Buford
 Calhoun
 Camak
 Canon
 Canton
 Carrollton
 Cartersville
 Cascade Heights
 Cascade Heights
 Cassville
 Cedartown
 Chamblee
 Chatham Crescent
 Chickamauga
 Clarkdale
 Clarkston
 Claxton
 Clermont
 Cleveland
 College Park
 Columbus
 Commerce
 Conley
 Conyers
 Covington
 Crescent
 Cumming
 Cuthbert
 Dacula
 Dahlonega
 Daisy
 Dallas
 Dalton
 Darien
 Dawsonville
 Dearing
 Decatur
 Dewy Rose
 Dobbins Afb
 Doraville
 Douglas
 Douglasville
 Druid Hills
 Druid Hills
 Dublin
 Duluth
 Dunwoody
 East Point
 Eatonton
 Eden
 Edison
 Elberton
 Ellabell
 Ellenwood
 Ellijay
 Emerson
 Euharlee
 Evans
 Experiment
 Fairburn
 Fairmount
 Faulkville
 Fayetteville
 Fleming
 Flintstone
 Flowery Branch
 Folkston
 Forest Park
 Fort Gaines
 Fort Gillem
 Fort Mcpherson
 Fort Oglethorp
 Fort Oglethorpe
 Fort Stewart
 Ft Mcpherson
 Gainesville
 Garden City
 Garden Hills
 Garden Hills
 Gillsville
 Glennville
 Glenwood
 Glynco
 Governors Towne Club
 Gracewood
 Grant Park
 Grant Park
 Grantville
 Grayson
 Greensboro
 Griffin
 Grovetown
 Guyton
 Haaf
 Hagan
 Hampton
 Hapeville
 Harlem
 Hartsfield Intl
 Hartwell
 Hephzibah
 Hinesville
 Hiram
 Historic South District
 Hogansville
 Holly Springs
 Homeland
 Homerville
 Hortense
 Hoschton
 Hunter Aaf
 Indian Hills
 Indian Hills
 Isle Of Hope
 Jackson
 Jasper
 Jefferson
 Jekyll Island
 Jersey
 Jesup
 Johns Creek
 Jonesboro
 Kennesaw
 Keysville
 Kings Bay
 Kingsland
 Kingston
 La Fayette
 Lafayette
 Lagrange
 Lake City
 Lawrenceville
 Lebanon
 Lepageville
 Lilburn
 Lincolnton
 Lindale
 Lithia Springs
 Lithonia
 Locust Grove
 Loganville
 Longleaf
 Longleaf
 Lookout Mountain
 Lookout Mtn
 Louisville
 Lovejoy
 Ludowici
 Lula
 Lumpkin
 Mableton
 Macon
 Mansfield
 Marietta
 Martinez
 Maysville
 Mcdonough
 Meldrim
 Metter
 Midtown
 Midway
 Milledgeville
 Millen
 Milner
 Milton
 Monroe
 Montezuma
 Monticello
 Morningside
 Morningside
 Morrow
 Mount Berry
 Mount Vernon
 Mount Zion
 Murrayville
 Nahunta
 Newborn
 Newnan
 Norcross
 North Augusta
 Odum
 Oglethorpe
 Olin Heights
 Orchard Hill
 Ormewood Park
 Ormewood Park
 Oxford
 Palmetto
 Peachtree City
 Pembroke
 Pendergrass
 Pine Lake
 Plainville
 Pooler
 Port Wentworth
 Porterdale
 Powder Springs
 Quitman
 Red Oak
 Resaca
 Rex
 Riceboro
 Richland
 Richmond Hill
 Rincon
 Ringgold
 Riverdale
 Riverside
 Riverside
 Rock Spring
 Rockmart
 Rome
 Rossville
 Roswell
 Rydal
 Sagamore Hills
 Sagamore Hills
 Saint Marys
 Saint Simons Island
 Sandy Springs
 Savannah
 Scottdale
 Screven
 Sea Island
 Senoia
 Shannon
 Sharpsburg
 Shellman
 Sherwood Forest
 Sherwood Forest
 Silver Creek
 Skidaway Island
 Smyrna
 Snellville
 Social Circle
 Soperton
 Springfield
 St Simons Is
 St Simons Island
 Statesboro
 Statham
 Stockbridge
 Stone Mountain
 Sugar Hill
 Sugar Valley
 Suwanee
 Swainsboro
 Sylvania
 Tallapoosa
 Talmo
 Taylorsville
 Temple
 Thomasville
 Thomson
 Tifton
 Toccoa
 Townsend
 Trion
 Tucker
 Tuxedo Park
 Tuxedo Park
 Twin City
 Tybee
 Tybee Island
 Tyrone
 Union City
 Valdosta
 Vidalia
 Villa Rica
 Virginia Highland
 Virginia Highland
 Waco
 Wadley
 Waleska
 Walthourville
 Warner Robins
 Warrenton
 Washington
 Watkinsville
 Waycross
 Waynesboro
 Waynesville
 West Paces Ferry Road
 West Paces Ferry Road
 White
 White Oak
 Whitesburg
 Williamson
 Winder
 Windward
 Windward
 Winston
 Woodbine
 Woodmont
 Woodstock
 Wrightsville

Idaho (11)  

 Boise
 Coeur D'alene
 Fish Haven
 Franklin
 Idaho Falls
 Meridian
 Nampa
 Pocatello
 Post Falls

Illinois (534)  

 Addison
 Algonquin
 Alsip
 Amboy
 Antioch
 Arlington Heights
 Aroma Park
 Ashkum
 Ashton
 Aurora
 Baileyville
 Bannockburn
 Barrington
 Barrington Hills
 Bartlett
 Bartonville
 Batavia
 Beach Park
 Bedford Park
 Beecher
 Belleville
 Bellevue
 Bellwood
 Belvidere
 Bensenville
 Benton
 Berkeley
 Berwyn
 Blandinsville
 Bloomingdale
 Bloomington
 Blue Island
 Bolingbrook
 Bondville
 Bourbonnais
 Braceville
 Bradley
 Braidwood
 Bremen
 Bridgeport
 Bridgeview
 Bristol
 Broadlands
 Broadview
 Brookfield
 Brookport
 Browning
 Buckner
 Buffalo Grove
 Bull Valley
 Burbank
 Burnham
 Burr Ridge
 Bushnell
 Byron
 Caledonia
 Calumet City
 Calumet Park
 Campton Hills
 Canton
 Capron
 Carbon Hill
 Carbondale
 Carol Stream
 Carpentersville
 Carpentersvle
 Cary
 Cedarville
 Champaign
 Channahon
 Chatham
 Chebanse
 Cherry
 Cherry Valley
 Chicago
 Chicago Heights
 Chicago Ridge
 Chillicothe
 Chrisman
 Christopher
 Cicero
 Clarendon Hills
 Clifton
 Coal City
 Coello
 Colchester
 Cortland
 Country Club Hills
 Countryside
 Crest Hill
 Cresthill
 Creston
 Crestwood
 Crete
 Creve Coeur
 Crystal Lake
 Cuba
 Curran
 Custer Park
 Dahinda
 Dalton City
 Dalzell
 Danforth
 Danville
 Darien
 Decatur
 Deer Park
 Deerfield
 Dekalb
 Depue
 Des Plaines
 Diamond
 Divernon
 Dixmoor
 Dixon
 Dolton
 Downers Grove
 Du Quoin
 Dundas
 Dundee
 Dunlap
 E Galesburg
 East Dundee
 East Galesburg
 East Hazel Crest
 East Peoria
 Edwards
 Edwardsville
 Effingham
 Elburn
 Elgin
 Elk Grove Village
 Elmhurst
 Elmwood Park
 Elwin
 Elwood
 Eola
 Evanston
 Evergreen Park
 Ewing
 Fairmount
 Fithian
 Flossmoor
 Ford Heights
 Forest Park
 Forest View
 Forreston
 Forsyth
 Fort Sheridan
 Fowler
 Fox Lake
 Fox River Grove
 Fox River Valley Garden
 Frankfort
 Franklin Grove
 Franklin Park
 Freeport
 Gages Lake
 Galesburg
 Galt
 Garden Prairie
 Geneva
 Georgetown
 Gilberts
 Gilman
 Glen Ellyn
 Glenarm
 Glencoe
 Glendale Heights
 Glenview
 Glenwood
 Gold Coast
 Golf
 Grand Detour
 Grandview
 Grayslake
 Great Lakes
 Green Oaks
 Green Valley
 Groveland
 Gurnee
 Hainesville
 Hampshire
 Hanna City
 Hanover Park
 Harmon
 Harristown
 Harvard
 Harvey
 Harwood Heights
 Hawthorn Woods
 Hazel Crest
 Herscher
 Hickory Hills
 Highland Park
 Highwood
 Hillcrest
 Hillside
 Hines
 Hinsdale
 Hodgkins
 Hoffman Estates
 Holiday Hills
 Homer
 Homer Glen
 Hometown
 Homewood
 Huntley
 Illiopolis
 Indian Creek
 Indian Head Park
 Indianhead Park
 Indianola
 Ingleside
 Inverness
 Irving Park
 Island Lake
 Itasca
 Jacksonville
 Johnsburg
 Joliet
 Justice
 Kankakee
 Keeneyville
 Kenilworth
 Kewanee
 Kildeer
 Kings
 Knollwood
 Knoxville
 La Grange
 La Grange Highlands
 La Grange Park
 La Harpe
 La Moille
 La Salle
 Ladd
 Lafox
 Lagrange Hlds
 Lake Barrington
 Lake Bluff
 Lake Forest
 Lake In The Hills
 Lake Villa
 Lake Zurich
 Lakemoor
 Lakeshore East
 Lakeview
 Lakewood
 Lansing
 Leaf River
 Lemont
 Lewistown
 Libertyville
 Lincoln
 Lincoln Park
 Lincoln Square
 Lincolnshire
 Lincolnwood
 Lindenhurst
 Lisle
 Lockport
 Lombard
 Long Grove
 Loves Park
 Lower West Side
 Lynwood
 Lyons
 Machesney Park
 Macomb
 Magnificent Mile
 Mahomet
 Manhattan
 Manteno
 Maple Park
 Mapleton
 Marengo
 Marion
 Markham
 Marquette Heights
 Matteson
 Mattoon
 Maywood
 Mazon
 Mc Cook
 Mccook
 Mccullom Lake
 Mchenry
 Medinah
 Melrose Park
 Mendota
 Merrionette Park
 Metamora
 Metropolis
 Mettawa
 Midlothian
 Millington
 Minier
 Minooka
 Mokena
 Moline
 Monee
 Monmouth
 Montgomery
 Morris
 Morton
 Morton Grove
 Mossville
 Mount Morris
 Mount Prospect
 Mount Pulaski
 Mount Zion
 Mt. Morris
 Mt. Prospect
 Mt. Pulaski
 Mt. Zion
 Mulkeytown
 Muncie
 Mundelein
 Museum Park
 Naperville
 New Berlin
 New East Side
 New Lenox
 New Milford
 Newark
 Newman
 Niantic
 Niles
 Normal
 Norridge
 Norris
 North Aurora
 North Barrington
 North Chicago
 North Pekin
 North Riverside
 North Side
 Northbrook
 Northfield
 Northlake
 Northwoods
 Oak Brook
 Oak Forest
 Oak Lawn
 Oak Park
 Oakbrook Ter
 Oakbrook Terrace
 Oakwood
 Oakwood Hills
 Ogden
 Oglesby
 Old Mill Creek
 Old Mill Crk
 Old Town
 Olney
 Olympia Fields
 Olympia Flds
 Onarga
 Oregon
 Orland Hills
 Orland Park
 Oswego
 Ottawa
 Palatine
 Palos Heights
 Palos Hills
 Palos Park
 Park City
 Park Forest
 Park Ridge
 Pawnee
 Pecatonica
 Pekin
 Pembroke Township
 Peoria
 Peoria Heights
 Peotone
 Peru
 Philo
 Phoenix
 Pinckneyville
 Pingree Grove
 Piper City
 Plainfield
 Plano
 Plato Center
 Plato Cntr
 Pleasant Plains
 Pleasant Plns
 Plymouth
 Polo
 Poplar Grove
 Port Barrington
 Portage Park
 Posen
 Prairie Grove
 Prairie View
 Prairieview
 Princeton
 Prospect Heights
 Quincy
 Rantoul
 Richmond
 Richton Park
 Ridge Farm
 Ridott
 Ringwood
 River Forest
 River Grove
 River North
 River West
 Riverdale
 Riverside
 Riverton
 Riverwoods
 Robbins
 Rochelle
 Rochester
 Rock Falls
 Rock Island
 Rockdale
 Rockford
 Rockton
 Rolling Mdws
 Rolling Meadows
 Romeoville
 Roscoe
 Roselle
 Rosemont
 Round Lake
 Round Lake Beach
 Round Lake Heights
 Round Lake Park
 S Chicago Heights
 Saint Anne
 Saint Charles
 Saint Joseph
 Sandwich
 Sauk Village
 Savoy
 Schaumburg
 Schiller Park
 Sciota
 Scioto Mills
 Shabbona
 Shorewood
 Sidney
 Skokie
 Sleepy Hollow
 Somonauk
 South Barrington
 South Chicago Heights
 South Elgin
 South Holland
 South Loop
 South Pekin
 Spaulding
 Spring Bay
 Spring Grove
 Spring Valley
 Springfield
 St Anne
 St Charles
 Steger
 Sterling
 Stickney
 Stillman Valley
 Stone Park
 Streamwood
 Streator
 Streeterville
 Sugar Grove
 Summit
 Summit Argo
 Sycamore
 Tamaroa
 Techny
 The Loop
 Third Lake
 Thornton
 Tilton
 Tinley Park
 Tiskilwa
 Tower Lakes
 Tremont
 Trout Valley
 Union
 University Park
 Urbana
 Utica
 Vernon Hills
 Victoria
 Villa Park
 Village Of Lakewood
 Vlg Of Lakewd
 Volo
 Wadsworth
 Warrenville
 Wasco
 Washington
 Wauconda
 Waukegan
 Wayne
 West Chicago
 West Dundee
 West Loop
 West Peoria
 Westchester
 Western Springs
 Westmont
 Wheaton
 Wheeling
 Whittington
 Williamsfield
 Willow Brook
 Willow Springs
 Willowbrook
 Wilmette
 Wilmington
 Winfield
 Winnebago
 Winnetka
 Winthrop Harbor
 Winthrop Hbr
 Wonder Lake
 Wood Dale
 Woodridge
 Woodstock
 Worth
 Wrightwood
 Wyanet
 Yorkville
 Zion

Indiana (341)  

 Akron
 Albany
 Alexandria
 Anderson
 Andrews
 Angola
 Arcadia
 Arcola
 Atlanta
 Attica
 Atwood
 Auburn
 Aurora
 Avilla
 Avoca
 Avon
 Bargersville
 Batesville
 Battle Ground
 Bedford
 Beech Grove
 Berne
 Beverly Shores
 Bloomfield
 Bloomington
 Bluffton
 Boone Grove
 Bourbon
 Brazil
 Bremen
 Bringhurst
 Bristol
 Brookston
 Brookville
 Brownsburg
 Brownstown
 Bryant
 Buck Creek
 Buffalo
 Bunker Hill
 Burket
 Burlington
 Burnettsville
 Burns Harbor
 Butlerville
 Cambridge City
 Camby
 Camden
 Cannelton
 Carmel
 Carthage
 Cayuga
 Cedar Lake
 Centerville
 Chalmers
 Charlottesville
 Chesterfield
 Chesterton
 Churubusco
 Cicero
 Clarks Hill
 Claypool
 Clayton
 Clifford
 Colfax
 Columbia City
 Columbus
 Connersville
 Covington
 Crawfordsville
 Crown Point
 Culver
 Cutler
 Daleville
 Danville
 Dayton
 Decatur
 Delphi
 Demotte
 Denver
 Dillsboro
 Dublin
 Dunkirk
 Dunreith
 Dyer
 East Chicago
 Eaton
 Edinburgh
 Elizabethtown
 Elkhart
 Ellettsville
 Elwood
 Etna Green
 Evansville
 Fairland
 Fairmount
 Farmland
 Finly
 Fishers
 Flat Rock
 Flora
 Fort Wayne
 Fortville
 Fountain City
 Fountaintown
 Fowler
 Fowlerton
 Frankfort
 Franklin
 Galveston
 Gary
 Gas City
 Gaston
 Geneva
 Goshen
 Gosport
 Grabill
 Grammer
 Granger
 Greencastle
 Greendale
 Greenfield
 Greensboro
 Greensburg
 Greentown
 Greenwood
 Griffith
 Grissom AFB
 Guilford
 Hagerstown
 Hamlet
 Hammond
 Hanna
 Harrodsburg
 Hartford City
 Hartsville
 Hazelwood
 Hebron
 Hemlock
 Highland
 Hillsboro
 Hoagland
 Hobart
 Hope
 Hudson Lake
 Huntertown
 Huntington
 Idaville
 Indianapolis
 Jasper
 Jeffersonville
 Jonesville
 Kendallville
 Kennard
 Kingman
 Kingsbury
 Kingsford Heights
 Knightstown
 Kokomo
 La Porte
 Lafayette
 Lake Cicott
 Lake Station
 Lakeville
 LaPorte
 Lawrenceburg
 Lebanon
 Leo
 Lewisville
 Liberty
 Linton
 Logansport
 Long Beach
 Losantville
 Lowell
 Lynn
 Lyons
 Madison
 Marion
 Markleville
 Martinsville
 Maxwell
 Mc Cordsville
 Mccordsville
 Medora
 Mentone
 Merrillville
 Metamora
 Mexico
 Michiana Shores
 Michigan City
 Middlebury
 Middletown
 Milan
 Mill Creek
 Milton
 Mishawaka
 Modoc
 Monon
 Monroeville
 Monrovia
 Monterey
 Monticello
 Montmorenci
 Montpelier
 Mooreland
 Moores Hill
 Mooresville
 Morris
 Mount Summit
 Mulberry
 Muncie
 Munster
 Nashville
 New Albany
 New Carlisle
 New Castle
 New Haven
 New Palestine
 New Waverly
 New Whiteland
 Newburgh
 Noblesville
 North Judson
 North Liberty
 North Vernon
 Notre Dame
 Oakford
 Oakville
 Ogden Dunes
 Oldenburg
 Oolitic
 Orestes
 Osceola
 Osgood
 Ossian
 Otterbein
 Palatine
 Paragon
 Parker City
 Pendleton
 Pennville
 Pershing
 Peru
 Pierceton
 Pittsboro
 Plainfield
 Plymouth
 Portage
 Porter
 Portland
 Redkey
 Remington
 Rensselaer
 Reynolds
 Richmond
 Ridgeville
 Rising Sun
 Roanoke
 Rochester
 Rockfield
 Rolling Prairie
 Rossville
 Rushville
 Russiaville
 Saint John
 Saratoga
 Schererville
 Scipio
 Scottsburg
 Selma
 Seymour
 Sharpsville
 Shelbyville
 Sheridan
 Shipshewana
 Shirley
 Silver Lake
 Smithville
 Solsberry
 South Bend
 Speedway
 Spencer
 Spiceland
 Springport
 Springville
 St John
 Stanford
 Stinesville
 Stockwell
 Straughn
 Sullivan
 Sulphur Springs
 Sunman
 Switz City
 Syracuse
 Taylorsville
 Tell City
 Terre Haute
 Thorntown
 Tipton
 Trail Creek
 Union Mills
 Unionville
 Upland
 Vallonia
 Valparaiso
 Veedersburg
 Vernon
 Versailles
 Vincennes
 Wabash
 Wakarusa
 Walkerton
 Warsaw
 West College Corner
 West Harrison
 West Lafayette
 West Middleton
 West Newton
 Westfield
 Westport
 Westville
 Wheatfield
 Wheeler
 Whiteland
 Whiting
 Wilkinson
 Williams
 Williamsport
 Willow Branch
 Winchester
 Windfall
 Winfield
 Winona Lake
 Wolcott
 Woodburn
 Yeoman
 Yoder
 Yorktown
 Zionsville

Iowa (9)  

 Ames
 Bettendorf
 Cedar Rapids
 Davenport
 Des Moines
 Dubuque
 Iowa City
 Urbandale
 Waterloo

Kansas (13)  

 Gardner
 Kansas City
 Lawrence
 Leavenworth
 Leawood
 Lenexa
 Manhattan
 Olathe
 Overland Park
 Shawnee
 Shawnee Mission
 Topeka
 Wichita

Kentucky (68)  

 Ashland
 Beech Creek
 Beechmont
 Belton
 Benton
 Big Clifty
 Boaz
 Bowling Green
 Browder
 Buffalo
 Calvert City
 Campbellsville
 Cave City
 Cecilia
 Central City
 Clarkson
 Cleaton
 Drakesboro
 East View
 Eastview
 Elizabethtown
 Elk Horn
 Etown
 Florence
 Fort Campbell
 Frankfort
 Franklin
 Georgetown
 Glasgow
 Glendale
 Graham
 Greenville
 Hardin
 Hiseville
 Hodgenville
 Hopkinsville
 Horse Cave
 Kevil
 Lebanon Junction
 Ledbetter
 Leitchfield
 Lexington
 London
 Louisville
 Magnolia
 Mannsville
 Mayfield
 Melber
 Mount Sherman
 Murray
 Nicholasville
 Oak Grove
 Owensboro
 Paducah
 Powderly
 Prospect
 Radcliff
 Richmond
 Rineyville
 Somerset
 South Carrollton
 Summit
 Symsonia
 Union
 Vine Grove
 West Paducah
 White Mills
 Whitesburg

Louisiana (61)  

 Alexandria
 Barksdale Afb
 Baton Rouge
 Belcher
 Bethany
 Blanchard
 Bossier City
 Calhoun
 Caspiana
 Cedar Grove
 Choudrant
 City Center
 Collinston
 Covington
 Cut-off Junction (Shreveport)
 Dixie Gardens
 Downsville
 Edgard
 Eros
 Flournoy (Shreveport)
 Frierson
 Garyville
 Gilliam
 Gloster
 Gray
 Greenwood
 Gretna
 Haughton
 Hosston
 Houma
 Keithville
 Kenner
 La Place
 La Rosen (Shreveport)
 Lachute
 Lafayette
 Lake Charles
 Lakeview
 Laplace
 Lorraine
 Mandeville
 Metairie
 Monroe
 Mount Airy
 New Orleans
 North Highlands
 Reisor
 Reserve
 Richwood
 Ruston
 Schriever
 Shreveport
 Slidell
 Sterlington
 Stonewall
 Summer Grove
 Swartz
 Thibodaux
 Vacherie
 Werner Park
 West Monroe
 Jonesboro
 Minden

Maine (34)  

 Auburn
 Bailey Island
 Bangor
 Bath
 Berwick
 Bowdoin
 Bowdoinham
 Brownfield
 Brunswick
 Cape Elizabeth
 Durham
 Eliot
 Falmouth
 Freeport
 Harpswell
 Kennebunk
 Kittery
 Kittery Point
 Lewiston
 Orrs Island
 Phippsburg
 Portland
 Sebasco Estates
 South Berwick
 South Freeport
 South Portland
 Topsham
 Wells
 West Bath
 Woolwich
 Yarmouth
 York

Maryland (372)  

 Aberdeen
 Aberdeen Proving Ground
 Aberdeen Test
 Abingdon
 Accident
 Accokeek
 Adamstown
 Adelphi
 Allen
 Andrews Air Force Base
 Annapolis
 Annapolis Junction
 Apg-ea
 Arlington
 Arnold
 Ashton
 Baldwin
 Baltimore
 Barnesville
 Barton
 Beallsville
 Bel Air
 Bel Alton
 Belcamp
 Beltsville
 Benedict
 Berlin
 Berwyn Heights
 Bethesda
 Bethlehem
 Bishopville
 Bivalve
 Bladensburg
 Bloomington
 Boonsboro
 Bowie
 Boyds
 Braddock Heights
 Bradshaw
 Brandywine
 Brentwood
 Brinklow
 Brookeville
 Brooklandville
 Brookview
 Broomes Island
 Brunswick
 Bryans Road
 Bryantown
 Buckeystown
 Burkittsville
 Burtonsville
 Cabin John
 California
 Cambridge
 Camp Springs
 Capitol Heights
 Carroll
 Cascade
 Catonsville
 Cecilton
 Centreville
 Charlestown
 Charlotte Hall
 Chase
 Cheltenham
 Chesapeake Beach
 Chesapeake City
 Chester
 Chestertown
 Cheverly
 Chevy Chase
 Childs
 Church Creek
 Churchton
 Churchville
 Clarksburg
 Clarksville
 Clear Spring
 Clinton
 Cobb Island
 Cockeysville
 Colesville
 College Park
 Colmar Manor
 Columbia
 Cooksville
 Cottage City
 Crofton
 Crownsville
 Cumberland
 Damascus
 Darlington
 Darnestown
 Davidsonville
 Dayton
 Deal Island
 Deale
 Deer Park
 Delmar
 Denton
 Derwood
 Dickerson
 District Heights
 Dowell
 Dundalk
 Dunkirk
 Earleville
 East New Market
 Easton
 Eden
 Edgewater
 Edgewood
 Edmonston
 Eldersburg
 Elk Mills
 Elkridge
 Elkton
 Ellicott City
 Ellicott City Test
 Emmitsburg
 Essex
 Fairmount Heights
 Fairmount Hgts
 Fallston
 Federalsburg
 Finksburg
 Forest Heights
 Forest Hill
 Forestville
 Fork
 Fort Howard
 Fort Meade
 Fort Washington
 Frederick
 Freeland
 Friendship
 Friendsville
 Frostburg
 Fruitland
 Ft Washington
 Fulton
 Gaithersburg
 Galena
 Galesville
 Gambrills
 Garrett Park
 Georgetown
 Germantown
 Gibson Island
 Girdletree
 Glen Arm
 Glen Burnie
 Glen Echo
 Glenarden
 Glenburnie
 Glenelg
 Glenn Dale
 Glenwood
 Glyndon
 Goldsboro
 Govans
 Grantsville
 Greenbelt
 Greensboro
 Gunpowder
 Gwynn Oak
 Hagerstown
 Halethorpe
 Hampstead
 Hancock
 Hanover
 Harmans
 Harwood
 Havre De Grace
 Hebron
 Henderson
 Highland
 Highlandtown
 Hillcrest Heights
 Hillsboro
 Hollywood
 Hughesville
 Hunt Valley
 Huntingtown
 Hurlock
 Hyattsville
 Hydes
 Ijamsville
 Indian Head
 Issue
 Jarrettsville
 Jefferson
 Jessup
 Joppa
 Keedysville
 Kensington
 Keymar
 Kingsville
 Knoxville
 La Plata
 Landover
 Landover Hills
 Lanham
 Largo
 Laurel
 Laytonsville
 Leonardtown
 Lexington Park
 Libertytown
 Linkwood
 Linthicum
 Linthicum Heights
 Lisbon
 Lonaconing
 Long Green
 Lothian
 Luke
 Lusby
 Lutherville
 Lutherville Timonium
 Madison
 Manchester
 Marbury
 Mardela Springs
 Marriottsville
 Marydel
 Maryland Line
 Mayo
 Mc Henry
 Mccoole
 Mchenry
 Mechanicsville
 Middle River
 Middletown
 Midland
 Midlothian
 Millersville
 Mitchellville
 Monkton
 Monrovia
 Montgomery Village
 Morningside
 Mount Airy
 Mount Rainier
 Mount Savage
 Mt Washington
 Myersville
 Nanticoke
 New Carrollton
 New Market
 New Midway
 New Windsor
 Newburg
 North Beach
 North Bethesda
 North Brentwood
 North East
 North Potomac
 Northwood
 Nottingham
 Oakland
 Ocean City
 Ocean Pines
 Odenton
 Olney
 Owings
 Owings Mills
 Oxon Hill
 Parkton
 Parkville
 Parsonsburg
 Pasadena
 Perry Hall
 Perryman
 Perryville
 Phoenix
 Pikesville
 Pocomoke
 Pocomoke City
 Point Of Rocks
 Pomfret
 Poolesville
 Port Deposit
 Port Republic
 Port Tobacco
 Potomac
 Preston
 Prince Frederick
 Princess Anne
 Quantico
 Queen Anne
 Queenstown
 Randallstown
 Raspeburg
 Rawlings
 Reisterstown
 Rhodesdale
 Rhodesville
 Ridgely
 Rising Sun
 Riva
 Riverdale
 Rock Point
 Rockville
 Rocky Ridge
 Roland Park
 Rosedale
 Sabillasville
 Saint Leonard
 Salisbury
 Sandy Spring
 Savage
 Seat Pleasant
 Secretary
 Severn
 Severna Park
 Shady Side
 Sharpsburg
 Sharptown
 Sherwood Forest
 Silver Spring
 Smithsburg
 Snow Hill
 Solomons
 Sparks
 Sparks Glencoe
 Sparrows Point
 Spencerville
 Springdale
 Stevenson
 Stevensville
 Stockton
 Street
 Suitland
 Sunderland
 Swanton
 Sykesville
 Takoma Park
 Taneytown
 Temple Hills
 Thurmont
 Timonium
 Towson
 Tracys Landing
 Tyaskin
 Union Bridge
 University Park
 Upper Falls
 Upper Marlboro
 Upperco
 Urbana
 Vienna
 Waldorf
 Walkersville
 Warwick
 Washington Grove
 West Bethesda
 West Friendship
 West River
 Westernport
 Westminster
 Wheaton
 White Hall
 White Marsh
 White Plains
 Williamsport
 Windsor Mill
 Woodbine
 Woodsboro
 Woodstock
 Woolford

Massachusetts (431)  

 Abington
 Acton
 Acushnet
 Agawam
 Allston
 Amesbury
 Amherst
 Andover
 Aquinnah
 Arlington
 Ashburnham
 Ashby
 Ashland
 Assonet
 Athol
 Attleboro
 Attleboro Falls
 Auburn
 Auburndale
 Avon
 Ayer
 Babson Park
 Baldwinville
 Barnstable
 Bedford
 Belchertown
 Bellingham
 Belmont
 Berkley
 Berlin
 Bernardston
 Beverly
 Billerica
 Blackstone
 Bolton
 Bondsville
 Boston
 Bourne
 Boxboro
 Boxborough
 Boxford
 Boylston
 Bradford
 Braintree
 Brant Rock
 Brewster
 Bridgewater
 Brighton
 Brimfield
 Brockton
 Brookline
 Bryantville
 Buckland
 Burlington
 Buzzards Bay
 Byfield
 Cambridge
 Canton
 Carlisle
 Carver
 Cataumet
 Centerville
 Charlestown
 Charlton
 Chatham
 Chelmsford
 Chelsea
 Chester
 Chestnut Hill
 Chicopee
 Chilmark
 Clinton
 Cohasset
 Concord
 Conway
 Cotuit
 Craigville
 Cummaquid
 Danvers
 Dartmouth
 Dedham
 Deerfield
 Dennis
 Dennis Port
 Dennisport
 Devens
 Dighton
 Dorchester
 Dorchester Center
 Dover
 Dracut
 Duxbury
 East Boston
 East Bridgewater
 East Cambridge
 East Dennis
 East Falmouth
 East Freetown
 East Harwich
 East Longmeadow
 East Orleans
 East Sandwich
 East Taunton
 East Templeton
 East Walpole
 East Wareham
 East Weymouth
 Eastham
 Easthampton
 Easton
 Edgartown
 Erving
 Essex
 Everett
 Fairhaven
 Fall River
 Falmouth
 Feeding Hills
 Fitchburg
 Florence
 Forestdale
 Foxboro
 Framingham
 Franklin
 Gardner
 Georgetown
 Gilbertville
 Gill
 Gloucester
 Grafton
 Granby
 Granville
 Green Harbor
 Greenfield
 Groton
 Groveland
 Hadley
 Halifax
 Hamilton
 Hampden
 Hanover
 Hanscom Afb
 Hanson
 Hardwick
 Harvard
 Harwich
 Harwich Port
 Harwichport
 Hatfield
 Hathorne
 Haverhill
 Haydenville
 Hingham
 Holbrook
 Holden
 Holliston
 Holyoke
 Hopedale
 Hopkinton
 Housatonic
 Hudson
 Hull
 Humarock
 Huntington
 Hyannis
 Hyannis Port
 Hyde Park
 Indian Orchard
 Ipswich
 Jamaica Plain
 Kingston
 Lake Pleasant
 Lakeville
 Lancaster
 Lawrence
 Leeds
 Leominster
 Lexington
 Lincoln
 Littleton
 Longmeadow
 Lowell
 Ludlow
 Lunenburg
 Lynn
 Lynnfield
 Malden
 Manchester
 Manomet
 Mansfield
 Marblehead
 Marion
 Marlborough
 Marshfield
 Marshfield Hills
 Marstons Mills
 Mashpee
 Mattapan
 Mattapoisett
 Maynard
 Medfield
 Medford
 Medway
 Melrose
 Mendon
 Menemsha
 Merrimac
 Methuen
 Middleboro
 Middleton
 Milford
 Millbury
 Millers Falls
 Millis
 Milton
 Monponsett
 Monson
 Montague
 Montgomery
 Monument Beach
 Nahant
 Nantucket
 Natick
 Needham
 Needham Heights
 New Bedford
 New Braintree
 Newbury
 Newburyport
 Newton
 Newton Center
 Newton Highlands
 Newton Lower Falls
 Newton Upper Falls
 Newtonville
 Norfolk
 North Andover
 North Attleboro
 North Billerica
 North Cambridge
 North Carver
 North Chatham
 North Chelmsford
 North Chester
 North Dartmouth
 North Dighton
 North Eastham
 North Easton
 North Falmouth
 North Grafton
 North Hatfield
 North Marshfield
 North Pembroke
 North Quincy
 North Reading
 North Truro
 North Weymouth
 Northampton
 Northboro
 Northfield
 Norton
 Norwell
 Norwood
 Nutting Lake
 Oak Bluffs
 Ocean Bluff
 Onset
 Orleans
 Osterville
 Otter River
 Palmer
 Peabody
 Pelham
 Pembroke
 Pepperell
 Phillipston
 Pinehurst
 Pittsfield
 Plainville
 Plymouth
 Plympton
 Pocasset
 Prides Crossing
 Princeton
 Provincetown
 Quincy
 Randolph
 Raynham
 Raynham Center
 Reading
 Rehoboth
 Revere
 Rochester
 Rockland
 Rockport
 Roslindale
 Rowley
 Roxbury
 Roxbury Crossing
 Royalston
 Sagamore
 Sagamore Beach
 Salem
 Salisbury
 Sandwich
 Saugus
 Scituate
 Seekonk
 Sharon
 Shelburne
 Shelburne Falls
 Sherborn
 Shirley
 Shrewsbury
 Siasconset
 Somerset
 Somerville
 South Attleboro
 South Boston
 South Carver
 South Chatham
 South Dartmouth
 South Deerfield
 South Dennis
 South Easton
 South Hadley
 South Hamilton
 South Harwich
 South Lancaster
 South Natick
 South Orleans
 South Walpole
 South Wellfleet
 South Weymouth
 South Yarmouth
 Southampton
 Southborough
 Southwick
 Spencer
 Springfield
 Sterling
 Stoneham
 Stoughton
 Stow
 Sturbridge
 Sudbury
 Sunderland
 Sutton
 Swampscott
 Swansea
 Taunton
 Teaticket
 Templeton
 Tewksbury
 Thorndike
 Three Rivers
 Tisbury
 Topsfield
 Townsend
 Truro
 Turners Falls
 Tyngsboro
 Upton
 Uxbridge
 Village Of Nagog Woods
 Vineyard Haven
 Waban
 Wakefield
 Walpole
 Waltham
 Waquoit
 Ware
 Wareham
 Warren
 Watertown
 Wayland
 Webster
 Wellesley
 Wellesley Hills
 Wellfleet
 Wenham
 West Barnstable
 West Boxford
 West Boylston
 West Bridgewater
 West Brookfield
 West Chatham
 West Dennis
 West Falmouth
 West Harwich
 West Hatfield
 West Hyannisport
 West Newbury
 West Newton
 West Roxbury
 West Springfield
 West Tisbury
 West Townsend
 West Wareham
 West Warren
 West Whately
 West Yarmouth
 Westborough
 Westfield
 Westford
 Westhampton
 Westminster
 Weston
 Westport
 Westwood
 Weymouth
 Whately
 Wheelwright
 White Horse Beach
 Whitinsville
 Whitman
 Wilbraham
 Williamsburg
 Williamstown
 Wilmington
 Winchendon
 Winchester
 Winthrop
 Woburn
 Wollaston
 Woods Hole
 Worcester
 Wrentham
 Yarmouth
 Yarmouth Port
 Yarmouthport

Michigan (397)   

 Ada
 Addison
 Adrian
 Albion
 Algonac
 Allegan
 Allen
 Allen Park
 Allendale
 Almont
 Alpena
 Alto
 Ann Arbor
 Applegate
 Armada
 Auburn Hills
 Augusta
 Bad Axe
 Bangor
 Baroda
 Bath
 Battle Creek
 Bay City
 Bay Port
 Bayport
 Belding
 Belleville
 Bellevue
 Belmont
 Benton Harbor
 Berkley
 Berrien Center
 Berrien Springs
 Beverly Hills
 Bingham Farms
 Birch Run
 Birmingham
 Bloomfield
 Bloomfield Hills
 Bridgman
 Brighton
 Britton
 Brooklyn
 Brown City
 Brownstown
 Brownstown Township
 Bruce Township
 Buchanan
 Burtchville
 Burton
 Byron Center
 Cadillac
 Cadmus
 Caledonia
 Cannonsburg
 Canton
 Capac
 Carleton
 Carsonville
 Casco
 Caseville
 Cassopolis
 Cedar Springs
 Cement City
 Center Line
 Centreville
 Ceresco
 Charlevoix
 Charlotte
 Chelsea
 Chesterfield
 China
 City Center
 Clarklake
 Clarkston
 Clawson
 Clay
 Clayton
 Clinton
 Clinton Township
 Clio
 Clyde
 Coldwater
 Coloma
 Columbus
 Commerce
 Commerce Township
 Comstock Park
 Conklin
 Constantine
 Cottrellville
 Covert
 Croswell
 Davisburg
 Davison
 Dearborn
 Dearborn Heights
 Decatur
 Deckerville
 Detroit
 Dewitt
 Dexter
 Dimondale
 Douglas
 Dowagiac
 Dundee
 East China
 East Lansing
 East Leroy
 Eastpointe
 Eaton Rapids
 Eau Claire
 Ecorse
 Edwardsburg
 Elkton
 Fair Haven
 Farmington
 Farmington Hills
 Fennville
 Fenton
 Ferndale
 Ferrysburg
 Filion
 Flat Rock
 Flint
 Flushing
 Fort Gratiot
 Fowlerville
 Franklin
 Fraser
 Fremont
 Fruitport
 Gagetown
 Galesburg
 Galien
 Garden City
 Gaylord
 Genesee
 Gibraltar
 Gladwin
 Glenn
 Goodrich
 Grand Beach
 Grand Blanc
 Grand Haven
 Grand Ledge
 Grand Rapids
 Grandville
 Grass Lake
 Grayling
 Greenville
 Gross Pointe
 Grosse Ile
 Grosse Point Farms
 Grosse Pointe
 Grosse Pointe Farms
 Grosse Pointe Park
 Grosse Pointe Shores
 Grosse Pointe Shrs
 Grosse Pointe Woods
 Hamtramck
 Harbert
 Harbor Beach
 Harbor Springs
 Harper Woods
 Harrison
 Harrison Township
 Harrison Twp
 Harsens Island
 Hartford
 Hartland
 Haslett
 Hastings
 Hazel Park
 Hickory Corners
 Highland
 Highland Park
 Hillsdale
 Holland
 Holly
 Holt
 Holton
 Horton
 Howell
 Hudson
 Hudsonville
 Huntington Woods
 Inkster
 Jackson
 Jasper
 Jenison
 Jerome
 Jones
 Jonesville
 Kalamazoo
 Keego Harbor
 Kentwood
 Kimball
 Kinde
 La Salle
 Lake Angelus
 Lake Orion
 Lakeside
 Lambertville
 Lansing
 Lapeer
 Lathrup Village
 Lawrence
 Lawton
 Lenox
 Leonard
 Lexington
 Lincoln Park
 Linden
 Livonia
 Lowell
 Ludington
 Lyons
 Macomb
 Madison Heights
 Manchester
 Manitou Beach
 Marcellus
 Marine City
 Marlette
 Marne
 Marquette
 Marshall
 Marysville
 Mason
 Mattawan
 Maybee
 Melvin
 Melvindale
 Memphis
 Mendon
 Metamora
 Michiana
 Michigan Center
 Midland
 Milan
 Milford
 Monroe
 Montrose
 Mosherville
 Mount Clemens
 Mount Morris
 Muskegon
 Napoleon
 New Baltimore
 New Boston
 New Buffalo
 New Haven
 New Hudson
 New Troy
 Newaygo
 Newport
 Niles
 North Adams
 North Street
 Northville
 Norton Shores
 Norvell
 Nottawa
 Novi
 Oak Park
 Oakland
 Oakland Township
 Okemos
 Onsted
 Orchard Lake
 Orion
 Ortonville
 Oscoda
 Osseo
 Otisville
 Owendale
 Owosso
 Oxford
 Palmyra
 Parma
 Paw Paw
 Peck
 Petoskey
 Pigeon
 Pinckney
 Pittsford
 Plainwell
 Pleasant Ridge
 Plymouth
 Pontiac
 Port Austin
 Port Hope
 Port Huron
 Port Sanilac
 Portage
 Ravenna
 Ray
 Ray Township
 Redford
 Richland
 Richmond
 Ridgeway
 Riley Township
 River Rouge
 Riverside
 Riverview
 Rochester
 Rochester Hills
 Rockford
 Rockwood
 Rollin
 Romeo
 Romulus
 Roscommon
 Roseville
 Royal Oak
 Royal Oak Township
 Saginaw
 Saint Clair
 Saint Clair Shores
 Saint Joseph
 Saline
 Sand Creek
 Sandusky
 Saugatuck
 Sawyer
 Schoolcraft
 Scotts
 Sebewaing
 Shelby
 Shelby Township
 Smiths Creek
 Sodus
 Somerset Center
 South Haven
 South Lyon
 South Rockwood
 Southfield
 Southgate
 Sparta
 Spring Arbor
 Spring Lake
 Springfield
 St Clair
 St Joe
 St Joseph
 Sterling Heights
 Stevensville
 Sturgis
 Superior Township
 Swartz Creek
 Sylvan Lake
 Taylor
 Tecumseh
 Temperance
 Three Oaks
 Three Rivers
 Tipton
 Traverse City
 Trenton
 Troy
 Twin Lake
 Ubly
 Union
 Union Lake
 Union Pier
 Utica
 Vandalia
 Vicksburg
 Waldron
 Wales
 Walker
 Walled Lake
 Warren
 Washington
 Washington Township
 Waterford
 Watervliet
 Wayland
 Wayne
 West Bloomfield
 Westland
 White Lake
 White Pigeon
 Whitehall
 Whitmore Lake
 Whittaker
 Williamston
 Willis
 Wixom
 Woodhaven
 Wyandotte
 Wyoming
 Yale
 Ypsilanti
 Zeeland

Minnesota (138)  

 Afton
 Andover
 Anoka
 Apple Valley
 Arden Hills
 Bayport
 Baytown Township
 Bethel
 Birchwood
 Blaine
 Bloomington
 Brooklyn Center
 Brooklyn Park
 Buffalo
 Burnsville
 Carver
 Cedar
 Centerville
 Champlin
 Chanhassen
 Chaska
 Circle Pines
 Columbia Heights
 Coon Rapids
 Corcoran
 Cottage Grove
 Courtland
 Crystal
 Dayton
 Dellwood
 Duluth
 Eagan
 Eden Prairie
 Edina
 Elk River
 Essig
 Excelsior
 Falcon Heights
 Farmington
 Forest Lake
 Fridley
 Gem Lake
 Golden Valley
 Grant
 Ham Lake
 Hamel
 Hanover
 Hassan
 Hastings
 Hilltop
 Hopkins
 Hugo
 Inver Grove
 Inver Grove Heights
 Jordan
 Lake Elmo
 Lakeland
 Lakeville
 Landfall Village
 Lauderdale
 Lexington
 Lilydale
 Lino Lakes
 Little Canada
 Long Lake
 Loretto
 Madelia
 Mahtomedi
 Mankato
 Maple Grove
 Maplewood
 Meadowlands
 Medicine Lake
 Medina
 Mendota
 Mendota Heights
 Minneapolis
 Minnetonka
 Montrose
 Mound
 Mounds View
 Moundsview
 New Brighton
 New Hope
 New Prague
 New Ulm
 Newport
 North Oaks
 North Saint Paul
 North St Paul
 Northfield
 Oak Grove
 Oak Park Heights
 Oakdale
 Osseo
 Pine Springs
 Plymouth
 Prior Lake
 Ramsey
 Richfield
 Robbinsdale
 Rochester
 Rogers
 Rosemount
 Roseville
 Saint Anthony
 Saint Cloud
 Saint Francis
 Saint Louis Park
 Saint Michael
 Saint Paul
 Saint Paul Park
 Savage
 Shakopee
 Shoreview
 South Saint Paul
 South St Paul
 Spring Lake Park
 St Anthony
 St Croix Beach
 St Louis Park
 St Marys Point
 St Paul Park
 Stillwater
 Sunfish Lake
 Vadnais Heights
 Waconia
 Waverly
 Wayzata
 West Lakeland
 West Saint Paul
 West St Paul
 White Bear Lake
 White Bear Lk
 White Bear Township
 Willernie
 Winona
 Woodbury

Mississippi (111)  

 Bailey
 Baldwyn
 Bay Springs
 Bayard
 Beachaven
 Beauclerc Gardens
 Belden
 Biloxi
 Blue Springs
 Bolton
 Booneville
 Brandon
 Brookhaven
 Byhalia
 Byram
 Canton
 Clinton
 Coldwater
 Collinsville
 Columbia
 Como
 Corinth
 Crenshaw
 Deerwood Club
 East Hampton
 Edwards
 Ellisville
 Flora
 Florence
 Flowood
 Fulton
 Glen
 Goodman
 Greenfield
 Greenland
 Greenville
 Gulfport
 Guntown
 Hattiesburg
 Heidelberg
 Hernando
 Holly Springs
 Horn Lake
 Jackson
 Lake Cormorant
 Lauderdale
 Laurel
 Louin
 Lumberton
 Madison
 Mantachie
 Marietta
 Marion
 Meridian
 Mooreville
 Mount Pleasant
 Nesbit
 Ocean Springs
 Okolona
 Olive Branch
 Ortega
 Ortega Forrest
 Ortega Terrace
 Oxford
 Pachuta
 Pascagoula
 Paulding
 Pearl
 Pelahatchie
 Petal
 Plantersville
 Pontotoc
 Puckett
 Purvis
 Quitman
 Raymond
 Red Banks
 Richland
 Ridgeland
 Robinsonville
 Saltillo
 San Marco
 Sandersville
 Sardis
 Senatobia
 Shannon
 Sherman
 Sledge
 South Riverside
 Southaven
 Spring Lake
 Star
 Starkville
 Stringer
 Terry
 Tiplersville
 Toomsuba
 Tougaloo
 Tremont
 Tunica
 Tunica Resort
 Tupelo
 Utica
 Verona
 Vicksburg
 Vossburg
 Walls
 Walnut
 Waynesboro
 West Point
 Whitfield

Missouri (34)  

 Ballwin
 Bates City
 Belton
 Blue Springs
 Buckner
 Cass County
 Chesterfield
 Columbia
 Florissant
 Grain Valley
 Grandview
 Greenwood
 Independence
 Jefferson City
 Joplin
 Kansas City
 Lake Lotawana
 Lake Tapawingo
 Lake Winnebago
 Lee's Summit
 Lees Summit
 Liberty
 Oak Grove
 Odessa
 Peculiar
 Pleasant Hill
 Raymore
 Raytown
 Saint Charles
 Sibley
 Springfield
 St. Louis
 Sugar Creek
 Wildwood

Montana (6)  

 Billings
 Bozeman
 Great Falls
 Helena
 Kalispell
 Missoula

Nebraska (4)  

 Lincoln

Nevada (9)  

 Carson City
 Gardnerville
 Henderson
 Incline Village
 Las Vegas
 Mesquite
 Pahrump
 Reno
 Sparks

New Hampshire (149)  

 Allenstown
 Alstead
 Amherst
 Andover
 Antrim
 Ashuelot
 Atkinson
 Auburn
 Barrington
 Bedford
 Bennington
 Boscawen
 Bow
 Brentwood
 Canaan
 Candia
 Canterbury
 Charlestown
 Chester
 Chichester
 Claremont
 Concord
 Contoocook
 Cornish
 Cornish Flat
 Croydon
 Danbury
 Danville
 Deerfield
 Deering
 Derry
 Dover
 Drewsville
 Dunbarton
 Durham
 East Andover
 East Hampstead
 East Kingston
 Elkins
 Enfield
 Epping
 Epsom
 Etna
 Exeter
 Francestown
 Franklin
 Fremont
 Georges Mills
 Gilford
 Gilsum
 Goffstown
 Grantham
 Greenfield
 Greenland
 Greenville
 Hampstead
 Hampton
 Hampton Falls
 Hancock
 Hanover
 Henniker
 Hill
 Hillsboro
 Hillsborough
 Hinsdale
 Hollis
 Hooksett
 Hopkinton
 Hudson
 Jaffrey
 Keene
 Kensington
 Kingston
 Laconia
 Langdon
 Lebanon
 Lee
 Litchfield
 Londonderry
 Loudon
 Lyme
 Madbury
 Manchester
 Mason
 Meredith
 Meriden
 Merrimack
 Milford
 Mont Vernon
 Nashua
 New Boston
 New Castle
 New Ipswich
 New London
 Newcastle
 Newfields
 Newington
 Newmarket
 Newport
 Newton
 Newton Junction
 North Hampton
 North Salem
 North Walpole
 Northwood
 Nottingham
 Orange
 Pease Afb
 Pelham
 Pembroke
 Penacook
 Peterborough
 Pittsfield
 Plainfield
 Plaistow
 Portsmouth
 Raymond
 Richmond
 Rochester
 Rollinsford
 Rye
 Rye Beach
 Salem
 Salisbury
 Sandown
 Seabrook
 Sharon
 Somersworth
 South Hampton
 Springfield
 Stratham
 Sunapee
 Suncook
 Sutton
 Temple
 Unity
 Walpole
 Weare
 Webster
 West Chesterfield
 West Lebanon
 West Nottingham
 West Peterborough
 Wilmot
 Wilton
 Winchester
 Windham
 Windsor
 Wolfeboro

New Jersey (595)  

 Aberdeen
 Absecon
 Allendale
 Allenhurst
 Allentown
 Alloway
 Andover
 Annandale
 Asbury
 Atco
 Atl Highlands
 Atlantic City
 Audubon
 Avalon
 Avenel
 Barnegat
 Barnegat Light
 Barrington
 Basking Ridge
 Bay Head
 Bayonne
 Bayville
 Beach Haven
 Beachwood
 Beacon
 Bedminster
 Belford
 Belle Mead
 Belleville
 Bellmawr
 Belvidere
 Bergen Hill
 Bergen Square
 Bergenfield
 Berkeley Heights
 Berlin
 Bernardsville
 Beverly
 Blackwood
 Blairstown
 Blenheim
 Bloomfield
 Bloomsbury
 Boonton
 Bordentown
 Bound Brook
 Boyle Plaza
 Branchburg
 Brick
 Bricktown
 Bridgeport
 Bridgeton
 Bridgewater
 Brigantine
 Broadway
 Brooklawn
 Brookside
 Browns Mills
 Budd Lake
 Buena
 Burlington
 Caldwell
 Califon
 Camden
 Cape May
 Cape May Court House
 Cape May Point
 Carlstadt
 Carneys Point
 Carteret
 Cedar Brook
 Cedar Grove
 Cedar Run
 Cedarville
 Chatham
 Chelsea
 Cherry Hill
 Chester
 Chesterfield
 Cinnaminson
 Claremont
 Clark
 Clarksboro
 Clayton
 Clementon
 Cliffside Park
 Clifton
 Clinton
 Collingswood
 Cologne
 Colonia
 Columbus
 Communipaw
 Cookstown
 Corbin City
 Country Village
 Cranbury
 Cranford
 Cream Ridge
 Crosswicks
 Croxton
 Curries Woods
 Dayton
 Deal
 Deepwater
 Del Haven
 Delanco
 Delmont
 Delran
 Dennisville
 Denville
 Deptford
 Dividing Creek
 Dorchester
 Dover
 Droyer's Point
 Dumont
 Dunellen
 East Brunswick
 East Newark
 East Orange
 East Rutherford
 East Windsor
 Eastampton
 Eatontown
 Edgewater
 Edgewater Park
 Edison
 Egg Harbor
 Egg Harbor Township
 Elizabeth
 Elmer
 Elmwood Park
 Elwood
 Emerson
 Englewood
 Englishtown
 Erial
 Essex Fells
 Ewing
 Exchange Place
 Fair Haven
 Fair Lawn
 Fairfield
 Fairton
 Fanwood
 Far Hills
 Farmingdale
 Fieldsboro
 Five Corners
 Flagtown
 Flanders
 Flemington
 Florence
 Fords
 Forked River
 Fort Dix
 Fort Lee
 Fort Monmouth
 Fortescue
 Franklin Lakes
 Franklin Park
 Franklinville
 Freehold
 Galloway
 Garfield
 Garwood
 Gibbsboro
 Gibbstown
 Gillette
 Gladstone
 Glassboro
 Glen Gardner
 Glen Ridge
 Glen Rock
 Glendora
 Gloucester
 Gloucester City
 Great Meadows
 Green Brook
 Green Creek
 Green Village
 Greenville
 Grenloch
 Grove Street
 Hackensack
 Hackensack Riverfront
 Hackettstown
 Haddon Heights
 Haddonfield
 Hainesport
 Hamilton
 Hamilton Park
 Hammonton
 Hampton
 Harrison
 Harsimus
 Harvey Cedars
 Hawthorne
 Hazlet
 Hcb Toms River
 Heislerville
 Helmetta
 High Bridge
 Highland Park
 Highlands
 Hightstown
 Hillsborough
 Hillsdale
 Hillside
 Hilltop
 Historic Downtown
 Hoboken
 Holmdel
 Hopatcong
 Hopelawn
 Hopewell
 Hopewell Borough
 Hudson Waterfront
 India Square
 Irvington
 Iselin
 Island Heights
 Jackson
 Jackson Hill
 Jamesburg
 Jersey City
 Jobstown
 Journal Square
 Juliustown
 Keansburg
 Kearney
 Kearny
 Keasby
 Kendall Park
 Kenilworth
 Keyport
 Kingston
 Kinnelon
 Lakehurst
 Lambertville
 Landisville
 Lanoka Harbor
 Laurel Springs
 Lavallette
 Lawnside
 Lawrence Township
 Lawrenceville
 Lebanon
 Leesburg
 Leonardo
 Lincoln Park
 Lincoln Park/west Bergen
 Lincroft
 Linden
 Lindenwold
 Linwood
 Little Egg Harb
 Little Falls
 Little Ferry
 Little Silver
 Livingston
 Lodi
 Logan
 Long Branch
 Long Valley
 Longport
 Lumberton
 Lyndhurst
 Madison
 Magnolia
 Mahwah
 Malaga
 Manahawkin
 Manchester
 Mannington
 Mansfield
 Mantoloking
 Mantua
 Manville
 Maple Shade
 Maplewood
 Margate
 Margate City
 Marion
 Marlboro
 Marlton
 Marmora
 Martinsville
 Matawan
 Mays Landing
 Maywood
 Mcginley Square
 Mcguire Afb
 Medford
 Medford Lakes
 Mendham
 Mercerville
 Merchantville
 Metuchen
 Mickleton
 Middlesex
 Middletown
 Milford
 Millburn
 Millington
 Milltown
 Millville
 Milmay
 Minotola
 Mizpah
 Monmouth Beach
 Monmouth Jct
 Monroe
 Monroe Township
 Monroeville
 Montclair
 Montvale
 Montville
 Moorestown
 Morganville
 Morris Plains
 Morristown
 Mount Ephraim
 Mount Holly
 Mount Laurel
 Mountainside
 Mpk Toms River
 Mt Royal
 Mullica Hill
 Murray Hill
 N Arlington
 National Park
 Navesink
 New Brunswick
 New Egypt
 New Gretna
 New Lisbon
 New Milford
 New Monmouth
 New Providence
 New Vernon
 Newark
 Newfield
 Newport
 Newton
 Newtonville
 Normandy Beach
 North Bergen
 North Brunswick
 North Caldwell
 North Cape May
 North Plainfield
 North Wildwood
 Northfield
 Nutley
 Oakhurst
 Oakland
 Oaklyn
 Ocean
 Ocean City
 Ocean Gate
 Ocean View
 Oceanport
 Oceanville
 Old Tappan
 Oldwick
 Oradell
 Orange
 Oxford
 Palermo
 Palmyra
 Paramus
 Park Ridge
 Parlin
 Parsippany
 Passaic
 Paterson
 Paulsboro
 Paulus Hook
 Pavonia Newport
 Peapack
 Pedricktown
 Pemberton
 Pennington
 Pennington Borough
 Penns Grove
 Pennsauken
 Pennsville
 Perth Amboy
 Petersburg
 Phillipsburg
 Pilesgrove
 Pine Beach
 Pine Hill
 Piscataway
 Pitman
 Pittsgrove
 Pittstown
 Plainfield
 Plainsboro
 Pleasantville
 Point Pleasant
 Pomona
 Pompton Plains
 Port Elizabeth
 Port Liberte
 Port Monmouth
 Port Murray
 Port Norris
 Port Reading
 Port Republic
 Pottersville
 Princeton
 Princeton Jct
 Pt Pleasant B
 Quinton
 Rahway
 Ramsey
 Rancocas
 Randolph
 Raritan
 Red Bank
 Richland
 Richwood
 Ridgefield
 Ridgewood
 Ringoes
 Ringwood
 Rio Grande
 River Edge
 River Vale
 Riverbend
 Riverside
 Riverton
 Robbinsville
 Rockaway
 Rocky Hill
 Roebling
 Roosevelt
 Rosehayn
 Roseland
 Roselle
 Roselle Park
 Rosenhayn
 Rumson
 Runnemede
 Rutherford
 Saddle Brook
 Saddle River
 Salem
 Salem-lafayette
 Sayreville
 Scotch Plains
 Sea Bright
 Sea Isle City
 Seaville
 Secaucus
 Sewaren
 Sewell
 Shamong
 Shiloh
 Ship Bottom
 Short Hills
 Shrewsbury
 Sicklerville
 Skillman
 Smithville
 So Plainfield
 So Toms River
 Society Hill
 Somerdale
 Somers Point
 Somerset
 Somerville
 South Amboy
 South Dennis
 South Orange
 South River
 South Seaville
 Southampton
 Sparrow Hill
 Sparta
 Spotswood
 Springfield
 Srp Toms River
 Stanhope
 Stewartsville
 Stirling
 Stockton
 Stone Harbor
 Stratford
 Strathmere
 Succasunna
 Summit
 Surf City
 Swainton
 Swedesboro
 Tabernacle
 Teaneck
 Tenafly
 The Heights
 The Hilltop
 The Island
 The Junction
 The Village
 Thorofare
 Three Bridges
 Tinton Falls
 Titusville
 Toms River
 Totowa
 Towaco
 Trenton
 Tuckahoe
 Tuckerton
 Turnersville
 Union
 Union City
 Upper Montclair
 Van Vorst Park
 Vauxhall
 Ventnor City
 Verona
 Villas
 Vincentown
 Vineland
 Voorhees
 W. Long Branch
 Waldwick
 Wallington
 Wanaque
 Waretown
 Warren
 Washington
 Washington Village
 Watchung
 Waterford
 Waterford Works
 Wayne
 Weehawken
 Wenonah
 West Berlin
 West Caldwell
 West Cape May
 West Creek
 West End
 West Milford
 West Orange
 West Side
 West Trenton
 West Wildwood
 Westampton
 Western Slope
 Westfield
 Westmont
 Westville
 Westwood
 Whippany
 White Hse Sta
 Whitehouse
 Whitesboro
 Whiting
 Wildwood
 Wildwood Crest
 Williamstown
 Willingboro
 Winfield Park
 Winslow
 Woodbine
 Woodbridge
 Woodbury
 Woodbury Hts
 Woodcliff Lake
 Woodlynne
 Woodstown
 Woolwich
 Woolwich Twp
 Wrightstown
 Wyckoff
 Yardville

New Mexico (76)  

 Alamogordo
 Albuquerque
 Angel Fire
 Arenas Valley
 Aztec
 Bayard
 Belen
 Bernalillo
 Bloomfield
 Bluewater
 Bosque Farms
 Carlsbad
 Cedar Crest
 Cerro
 Church Rock
 Cimarron
 Clovis
 Corrales
 Deming
 Dona Ana
 Edgewood
 El Prado
 Espanola
 Fairacres
 Farmington
 Flora Vista
 Fruitland
 Gallup
 Gamerco
 Grants
 Hatch
 Hobbs
 Hurley
 Isleta
 Kafb
 Kirtland
 Kirtland AFB
 La Plata
 Las Cruces
 Las Vegas
 Los Alamos
 Los Lunas
 Los Ranchos
 Lovington
 Mentmore
 Mesilla
 Mesilla Park
 Milan
 Moriarity
 Organ
 Pecos
 Peralta
 Placitas
 Pojoaque
 Portales
 Questa
 Ranchos De Taos
 Raton
 Red River
 Rio Rancho
 Roswell
 San Rafael
 Sandia Park
 Santa Clara
 Santa Fe
 Silver City
 Socorro
 Springer
 Taos
 Tesuque
 Thoreau
 Tijeras
 Tome
 Tucumcari
 Tyrone
 White Sands

New York (14)  

 Brewster
 Carmel
 Holmes
 Hopewell Junction
 Lagrangeville
 Mahopac
 Mahopac Falls
 Monsey
 Patterson
 Pawling
 Poughquag
 Putnam Valley
 Somers
 Stormville

North Carolina (55)  

 Ahoskie
 Apex
 Arden
 Asheville
 Boone
 Brevard
 Burlington
 Cary
 Chapel Hill
 Charlotte
 Clayton
 Clemmons
 Concord
 Cornelius
 Davidson
 Durham
 Eden
 Elizabeth City
 Fayetteville
 Franklin
 Garner
 Gastonia
 Goldsboro
 Greensboro
 Greenville
 Hendersonville
 Hickory
 High Point
 Highlands
 Holly Springs
 Huntersville
 Jacksonville
 Kernersville
 Matthews
 Monroe
 Mooresville
 Morrisville
 Murphy
 New Bern
 Pelham
 Pinehurst
 Providence
 Raleigh
 Rocky Mount
 Salisbury
 Sanford
 Southport
 Statesville
 Wake Forest
 Waxhaw
 Waynesville
 Wilmington
 Wilson
 Winston-salem
 Yanceyville

North Dakota (3)  

 Bismarck
 Fargo
 Grand Forks

Ohio (129)  

 Adena
 Akron
 Aurora
 Avon Lake
 Barnesville
 Beachwood
 Beavercreek
 Bellaire
 Belmont
 Bethesda
 Blaine
 Bloomingdale
 Bowling Green
 Brecksville
 Bridgeport
 Brilliant
 Cadiz
 Canfield
 Canton
 Centerville
 Chagrin Falls
 Chillicothe
 Cincinnati
 Cleveland
 Colerain
 Columbiana
 Columbus
 Convoy
 Dayton
 Delaware
 Dillonvale
 Dublin
 East Liverpool
 East Palestine
 Elyria
 Fairborn
 Fairfield
 Fairpoint
 Findlay
 Flushing
 Fort Recovery
 Gahanna
 Grove City
 Hamilton
 Hammondsville
 Harrisville
 Hilliard
 Holland
 Holloway
 Hudson
 Independence
 Irondale
 Jacobsburg
 Kent
 Kettering
 Lafferty
 Lakewood
 Lancaster
 Lansing
 Lebanon
 Leetonia
 Lima
 Lisbon
 Loveland
 Mansfield
 Marion
 Martins Ferry
 Mason
 Massillon
 Maumee
 Medina
 Mentor
 Miamisburg
 Middletown
 Milford
 Mingo Junction
 Neffs
 Negley
 New Albany
 New Middletown
 New Waterford
 Newark
 Painesville
 Payne
 Pepper Pike
 Perrysburg
 Petersburg
 Pickerington
 Poland
 Port Clinton
 Powell
 Proctorville
 Rayland
 Reynoldsburg
 Richmond
 Rocky River
 Rogers
 Saint Clairsville
 Salem
 Sandusky
 Shadyside
 Shaker Heights
 Solon
 Springboro
 Springfield
 Steubenville
 Stow
 Strongsville
 Sylvania
 Tiltonsville
 Toledo
 Toronto
 Troy
 Twinsburg
 Wadsworth
 Warren
 Washingtonville
 Wellsville
 West Chester
 Westerville
 Westlake
 Willoughby
 Wintersville
 Wooster
 Worthington
 Xenia
 Yorkville
 Youngstown
 Zanesville

Oklahoma (8)  

 Bartlesville
 Broken Arrow
 Edmond
 Enid
 Lawton
 Norman
 Oklahoma City
 Tulsa

Oregon (73)  

 Adair Village
 Albany
 Aloha
 Amity
 Ashland
 Astoria
 Aurora
 Banks
 Beaverton
 Bend
 Boring
 Canby
 Carlton
 Clackamas
 Columbia City
 Corbett
 Cornelius
 Corvallis
 Dallas
 Damascus
 Dayton
 Deer Island
 Dundee
 Estacada
 Eugene
 Fairview
 Forest Grove
 Foster
 Gaston
 Gladstone
 Grants Pass
 Gresham
 Happy Valley
 Harrisburg
 Hillsboro
 Hood River
 Junction City
 Keizer
 Klamath Falls
 Lafayette
 Lake Oswego
 Lebanon
 Mcminnville
 Medford
 Milwaukie
 Monmouth
 Newberg
 Newport
 North Plains
 Oak Grove
 Oregon City
 Philomath
 Portland
 Redmond
 Roseburg
 Salem
 Sandy
 Scappoose
 Sherwood
 Silverton
 Springfield
 St. Helens
 Sweet Home
 Tangent
 Tigard
 Troutdale
 Tualatin
 Warren
 West Linn
 Wilsonville
 Wood Village
 Woodburn
 Yamhill

Pennsylvania (1021)  

 Abbottstown
 Abington
 Acosta
 Adamsburg
 Adrian
 Aldan
 Alexandria
 Aliquippa
 Allegheny
 Allentown
 Allenwood
 Allison Park
 Allport
 Altoona
 Alum Bank
 Ambler
 Ambridge
 Amity
 Anita
 Annville
 Antes Fort
 Apollo
 Archbald
 Ardara
 Ardmore
 Ardsley
 Arendtsville
 Armagh
 Armbrust
 Arnold
 Arona
 Ashville
 Aspers
 Aspinwall
 Aston
 Atglen
 Audubon
 Avalon
 Avis
 Avoca
 Avondale
 Avonmore
 Baden
 Bainbridge
 Bairdford
 Bala Cynwyd
 Bally
 Barto
 Beaver
 Beaver Falls
 Beaverdale
 Bechtelsville
 Bedford
 Bedminster
 Beech Creek
 Belle Vernon
 Bellefonte
 Bellevue
 Belsano
 Bendersville
 Bensalem
 Bentleyville
 Berlin
 Bernville
 Berrysburg
 Berwyn
 Bessemer
 Bethel
 Bethel Park
 Bethlehem
 Big Run
 Biglerville
 Birchrunville
 Bird In Hand
 Birdsboro
 Black Lick
 Blairsville
 Blakely
 Blanchard
 Blandburg
 Blandon
 Blawnox
 Blooming Glen
 Bloomsburg
 Blue Ball
 Blue Bell
 Boalsburg
 Boiling Springs
 Bolivar
 Boothwyn
 Boswell
 Bovard
 Boyertown
 Brackenridge
 Braddock
 Bradenville
 Bradford
 Brandamore
 Breezewood
 Brentwood
 Bridgeport
 Bridgeville
 Brisbin
 Bristol
 Broad Top
 Brockport
 Brockway
 Brogue
 Brookhaven
 Brookville
 Broomall
 Bryn Athyn
 Bryn Mawr
 Buckingham
 Buena Vista
 Bulger
 Bunola
 Burgettstown
 Burnham
 Burnside
 Butler
 Cadogan
 Cairnbrook
 Camp Hill
 Campbelltown
 Canonsburg
 Carbondale
 Carlisle
 Carnegie
 Carrolltown
 Carversville
 Cashtown
 Cecil
 Center Valley
 Centerport
 Central City
 Centre Hall
 Chadds Ford
 Chalfont
 Chalk Hill
 Chambersburg
 Charleroi
 Cheltenham
 Cherry Tree
 Chester
 Chester Heights
 Chester Springs
 Chesterbrook
 Cheswick
 Cheyney
 Chinchilla
 Christiana
 Churchville
 Clairton
 Claridge
 Clarion
 Clarks Green
 Clarks Summit
 Clarksburg
 Claysville
 Clearfield
 Cleona
 Clifton Heights
 Clinton
 Clymer
 Coalport
 Coatesville
 Cochranville
 Codorus
 Cogan Station
 Collegeville
 Collingdale
 Colmar
 Columbia
 Colver
 Commodore
 Concordville
 Conemaugh
 Conestoga
 Confluence
 Connellsville
 Conshohocken
 Conway
 Coopersburg
 Coral
 Coraopolis
 Cornwall
 Corsica
 Coudersport
 Cowansville
 Crabtree
 Crafton
 Cranberry
 Creamery
 Creekside
 Creighton
 Crescent
 Cresson
 Cressona
 Croydon
 Crum Lynne
 Cuddy
 Curtisville
 Cyclone
 Dallas
 Dallastown
 Dalmatia
 Dalton
 Danboro
 Danville
 Darby
 Darlington
 Dauphin
 Dayton
 Defiance
 Delmont
 Delta
 Denver
 Derry
 Devon
 Dickson City
 Dillsburg
 Distant
 Dixonville
 Donora
 Douglassville
 Dover
 Downingtown
 Doylestown
 Dravosburg
 Dresher
 Drexel Hill
 Du Bois
 Dublin
 Dubois
 Duboistown
 Dudley
 Duke Center
 Duncannon
 Duncansville
 Dunlo
 Dunmore
 Dupont
 Duquesne
 Duryea
 Dysart
 E Fallowfld Twp
 Eagles Mere
 Eagleville
 East Berlin
 East Earl
 East Greenville
 East Lansdowne
 East Liberty
 East Mckeesport
 East Norriton
 East Petersburg
 East Pittsburgh
 East Prospect
 East Vandergrift
 Easton
 Ebensburg
 Eddystone
 Edgemont
 Edinburg
 Edwardsville
 Eighty Four
 Elderton
 Eldred
 Elizabeth
 Elizabethtown
 Elizabethville
 Elkins Park
 Ellwood City
 Elmora
 Elrama
 Elton
 Elverson
 Emeigh
 Emigsville
 Emlenton
 Emmaus
 Emsworth
 Enola
 Enon Valley
 Ephrata
 Erdenheim
 Erie
 Ernest
 Essington
 Etna
 Etters
 Everett
 Exeter
 Export
 Exton
 Eynon
 Factoryville
 Fairfield
 Fairless Hills
 Fairmount City
 Fallentimber
 Falls
 Falls Creek
 Fallsington
 Farmington
 Fayette City
 Fayetteville
 Feasterville
 Feasterville Trevo
 Felton
 Finleyville
 Fishertown
 Fleetwood
 Flinton
 Flourtown
 Folcroft
 Folsom
 Forbes Road
 Ford City
 Ford Cliff
 Fort Loudon
 Forty Fort
 Fountainville
 Franklin
 Franklintown
 Frazer
 Frederick
 Fredericksburg
 Freedom
 Freeport
 Friedens
 Friedensburg
 Furlong
 Gallitzin
 Gap
 Gardners
 Garnet Valley
 Garrett
 Georgetown
 Gettysburg
 Gibsonia
 Gifford
 Gilbertsville
 Gladwyne
 Glasgow
 Glassport
 Glen Campbell
 Glen Mills
 Glen Rock
 Glenmoore
 Glenolden
 Glenshaw
 Glenside
 Glenville
 Glenwillard
 Gordonville
 Gouldsboro
 Graceton
 Grantham
 Grantville
 Grapeville
 Gratz
 Gray
 Green Lane
 Greencastle
 Greenock
 Greensburg
 Gwynedd
 Gwynedd Valley
 Halifax
 Hamburg
 Hannastown
 Hanover
 Harding
 Harleysville
 Harrisburg
 Harrison City
 Harveys Lake
 Harwick
 Hastings
 Hatboro
 Hatfield
 Haverford
 Havertown
 Hawk Run
 Hawley
 Hawthorn
 Hegins
 Heilwood
 Hellam
 Hellertown
 Herminie
 Hermitage
 Hershey
 Hesston
 Hickory
 Highspire
 Hillsdale
 Hillsville
 Hilltown
 Holicong
 Holland
 Hollidaysburg
 Holmes
 Holtwood
 Homer City
 Homestead
 Honey Brook
 Hookstown
 Hooversville
 Hopewell
 Horsham
 Hostetter
 Houston
 Houtzdale
 Howard
 Hughestown
 Hughesville
 Hulmeville
 Hummelstown
 Hunker
 Huntingdon
 Huntingdon Valley
 Hustontown
 Hutchinson
 Hyde Park
 Hyndman
 Imperial
 Indiana
 Indianola
 Industry
 Ingomar
 Inkerman
 Intercourse
 Irvona
 Irwin
 Ivyland
 Jacobus
 James City
 James Creek
 Jamison
 Jeannette
 Jefferson Hills
 Jeffersonville
 Jenkintown
 Jenners
 Jennerstown
 Jermyn
 Jersey Shore
 Jessup
 Johnstown
 Jonestown
 Josephine
 Kane
 Kennett Square
 Kimberton
 King Of Prussia
 Kingston
 Kinzers
 Kittanning
 Kulpsville
 Kutztown
 Lafayette Hill
 Lahaska
 Lake Ariel
 Lamar
 Lamott
 Lancaster County
 Landenberg
 Landisburg
 Landisville
 Landsdale
 Landsdowne
 Langhorne
 Lansdale
 Lansdowne
 Laporte
 Larimer
 Latrobe
 Laughlintown
 Laureldale
 Lawrence
 Lebanon
 Lederach
 Leechburg
 Leesport
 Leetsdale
 Lemont
 Lemoyne
 Lenhartsville
 Leola
 Lester
 Levittown
 Lewisberry
 Lewisburg
 Lewistown
 Ligonier
 Lilly
 Lima
 Limerick
 Lincoln Univ
 Linden
 Line Lexington
 Linfield
 Linwood
 Lititz
 Littlestown
 Liverpool
 Llewellyn
 Lock Haven
 Loganton
 Loganville
 Loretto
 Lowber
 Lower Burrell
 Lower Gwynedd
 Loyalhanna
 Lucernemines
 Lumberville
 Luthersburg
 Luxor
 Luzerne
 Lykens
 Macungie
 Madera
 Madison
 Madison Twp
 Mahaffey
 Malvern
 Manchester
 Manheim
 Manns Choice
 Manor
 Manorville
 Maple Glen
 Marcus Hook
 Marietta
 Marion
 Marion Center
 Markleysburg
 Marlin
 Marysville
 Mayport
 Maytown
 Mc Connellsburg
 Mc Donald
 Mc Elhattan
 Mc Kees Rocks
 Mc Murray
 Mc Sherrystown
 Mckeesport
 Meadow Lands
 Meadowbrook
 Meadville
 Mechanicsburg
 Mechanicsville
 Media
 Melrose Park
 Mercersburg
 Merion
 Merion Station
 Meyersdale
 Middletown
 Midland
 Midway
 Milesburg
 Milford
 Milford Square
 Mill Creek
 Mill Hall
 Millersburg
 Millerstown
 Millersville
 Millvale
 Milroy
 Milton
 Minersville
 Modena
 Mohnton
 Mohrsville
 Monaca
 Monessen
 Monongahela
 Monroeton
 Monroeville
 Mont Alto
 Mont Clare
 Montgomery
 Montgomeryville
 Montoursville
 Moon Township
 Moosic
 Morgan
 Morgantown
 Morrisdale
 Morrisville
 Morton
 Moscow
 Mount Jewett
 Mount Lebanon
 Mount Morris
 Mount Oliver
 Mount Pleasant
 Mount Washington
 Mountain Top
 Mountville
 Mt Aetna
 Mt Holly Spgs
 Mt Joy
 Mt Union
 Mt Wolf
 Muir
 Muncy
 Munhall
 Munson
 Murrysville
 Muse
 Myerstown
 Nanticoke
 Nanty Glo
 Narberth
 Narvon
 Natrona Heights
 Nazareth
 Neville Island
 New Alexandria
 New Bedford
 New Berlinville
 New Bethlehem
 New Bloomfield
 New Brighton
 New Britain
 New Castle
 New Cumberland
 New Derry
 New Eagle
 New Florence
 New Freedom
 New Galilee
 New Holland
 New Hope
 New Kensington
 New Kingstown
 New London
 New Oxford
 New Paris
 New Providence
 New Stanton
 New Wilmington
 Newmanstown
 Newport
 Newportville
 Newton Hamilton
 Newtown
 Newtown Square
 Newville
 Nicholson
 Nicktown
 Norristown
 North Apollo
 North Bend
 North Versailles
 North Wales
 Northern Cambria
 Norwood
 Nottingham
 Oak Ridge
 Oakdale
 Oakford
 Oakmont
 Oaks
 Observatory
 Ohiopyle
 Oil City
 Old Forge
 Oley
 Olyphant
 Ono
 Oreland
 Orrtanna
 Orwigsburg
 Osceola Mills
 Ottsville
 Oxford
 Palm
 Palmyra
 Paoli
 Paradise
 Parker
 Parker Ford
 Parkesburg
 Patton
 Peach Bottom
 Peckville
 Penn
 Penn Hills
 Penn Run
 Penn Valley
 Penndel
 Penns Park
 Pennsburg
 Pennsdale
 Pennsylvania Furnace
 Pequea
 Perkasie
 Perkiomenville
 Petersburg
 Philadelphia
 Philipsburg
 Phoenixville
 Picture Rocks
 Pillow
 Pine Grove
 Pineville
 Pipersville
 Pittsburgh
 Pittston
 Plainfield
 Plains
 Pleasant Gap
 Pleasant Hills
 Pleasant Unity
 Plum
 Plumsteadville
 Plumville
 Plymouth
 Plymouth Meeting
 Point Pleasant
 Pomeroy
 Port Clinton
 Port Matilda
 Portage
 Portersville
 Pottstown
 Pottsville
 Presto
 Pricedale
 Prospect Park
 Prosperity
 Pulaski
 Punxsutawney
 Quakertown
 Quarryville
 Quentin
 Quincy
 Radnor
 Ramey
 Reading
 Rector
 Red Hill
 Red Lion
 Reedsville
 Rehrersburg
 Reinholds
 Renovo
 Revloc
 Rew
 Reynoldsville
 Rheems
 Richboro
 Richland
 Richlandtown
 Riddlesburg
 Ridgway
 Ridley Park
 Rillton
 Rimersburg
 Rixford
 Roaring Brook
 Robertsdale
 Robesonia
 Robinson
 Rochester
 Rockledge
 Rockton
 Rockwood
 Ronks
 Rosemont
 Roslyn
 Rossiter
 Rouseville
 Rouzerville
 Royersford
 Ruffs Dale
 Rural Valley
 Russellton
 Rutledge
 Rydal
 S. Williamsport
 Sacramento
 Sadsburyville
 Sagamore
 Saint Benedict
 Saint Michael
 Saint Petersburg
 Saint Thomas
 Salina
 Salisbury
 Salix
 Salladaburg
 Saltsburg
 Salunga
 Sandy Ridge
 Sarver
 Saxonburg
 Saxton
 Schaefferstown
 Schellsburg
 Schuylkill Haven
 Schwenksville
 Scotland
 Scott Township
 Scranton
 Secane
 Sellersville
 Seltzer
 Seneca
 Seven Valleys
 Seward
 Sewickley
 Shanksville
 Sharon Hill
 Sharpsburg
 Shartlesville
 Shavertown
 Shelocta
 Shermans Dale
 Shillington
 Shippensburg
 Shippingport
 Shiremanstown
 Shirleysburg
 Shoemakersville
 Shrewsbury
 Shuykl Haven
 Sidman
 Sigel
 Silverdale
 Sinking Spring
 Six Mile Run
 Skippack
 Slickville
 Sligo
 Slippery Rock
 Smethport
 Smithmill
 Smokerun
 Smoketown
 Solebury
 Somerset
 Souderton
 South Fork
 South Heights
 South Mountain
 South Park
 Southampton
 Southeastern
 Southampton
 Spinnerstown
 Spring Church
 Spring City
 Spring Glen
 Spring Grove
 Spring House
 Spring Mills
 Spring Mount
 Springdale
 Springfield
 Springs
 State College
 State Line
 Steelton
 Stewartstown
 Stouchsburg
 Stowe
 Stoystown
 Strabane
 Strasburg
 Strattanville
 Strausstown
 Strongstown
 Stroudsburg
 Stump Creek
 Sturgeon
 Summerdale
 Summerhill
 Summerville
 Sumneytown
 Sutersville
 Swarthmore
 Swissvale
 Swoyersville
 Sykesville
 Tarentum
 Taylor
 Telford
 Temple
 Templeton
 Thomasville
 Thorndale
 Thornton
 Throop
 Toughkenamon
 Towanda
 Tower City
 Trafford
 Trainer
 Tremont
 Trevose
 Trucksville
 Trumbauersville
 Tullytown
 Tunkhannock
 Turbotville
 Turtle Creek
 Twin Rocks
 Tylersport
 Tyrone
 Uniontown
 Unionville
 Upland
 Upper Darby
 Upper Holland
 Upper Saint Clair
 Uwchland
 Valencia
 Valley Forge
 Valley View
 Van Voorhis
 Vandergrift
 Vanport
 Venetia
 Verona
 Villanova
 Vintondale
 Volant
 W Conshohocken
 Wagontown
 Wallingford
 Wampum
 Warminster
 Warrington
 Warwick
 Washington
 Watsontown
 Waverly
 Wayne
 Waynesboro
 Waynesburg
 Webster
 Wellsville
 Wendel
 Wernersville
 West Alexander
 West Bridgewater
 West Chester
 West Decatur
 West Elizabeth
 West Grove
 West Lawn
 West Leechburg
 West Mifflin
 West Newton
 West Pittston
 West Point
 West Reading
 West View
 West Wyoming
 Westchester
 Westland
 Westmoreland City
 Westover
 Westtown
 Wexford
 White Oak
 Whitehall
 Wilkes-barre
 Wilkinsburg
 Williamsburg
 Williamsport
 Williamstown
 Willow Grove
 Willow Street
 Wilmerding
 Wilmore
 Windber
 Windsor
 Womelsdorf
 Wood
 Woodlyn
 Woolrich
 Worcester
 Wormleysburg
 Worthington
 Wrightsville
 Wyano
 Wycombe
 Wyncote
 Wyndmoor
 Wynnewood
 Wyoming
 Wyomissing
 Wysox
 Yardley
 Yatesboro
 Yatesville
 Yeadon
 Yeagertown
 Yoe
 York
 York Haven
 York New Salem
 York Springs
 Yorkana
 Youngstown
 Youngwood
 Yukon
 Zelienople
 Zieglerville
 Zullinger

Rhode Island (21)  

 Barrington
 Bristol
 Coventry
 Cranston
 Cumberland
 Johnston
 Lincoln
 Middletown
 Narragansett
 Newport
 Pawtucket
 Portsmouth
 Providence
 Riverside
 Rumford
 Tiverton
 Wakefield
 Warren
 Warwick
 Westerly
 Woonsocket

South Carolina (79)  

 Adams Run
 Aiken
 Anderson
 Ansonborough
 Awendaw
 Beaufort
 Beech Island
 Belvedere
 Bluffton
 Brunson
 Calhoun Falls
 Cendar Springs
 Centerville
 Chapin
 Clearwater
 Columbia
 Conway
 Daniel Island
 Easley
 Edisto Island
 Elgin
 Fenwick Crossings
 Florence
 Folly Beach
 Fort Mill
 French Quarter
 Goose Creek
 Graniteville
 Greenville
 Greenwood
 Greer
 Hampton
 Hanahan
 Hareston Village
 Hilton Head
 Hilton Head Island
 Hollywood
 Irmo
 Isle Of Palms
 Jackson
 James Island
 Johns Island
 Ladson
 Lexington
 Mcas Beaufort
 Moncks Corner
 Mount Pleasant
 Murrells Inlet
 Myrtle Beach
 Newberry
 North Augusta
 North Charleston
 Orange Grove Creek
 Orangeburg
 Pawleys Island
 Port Royal
 Prosperity
 Radcliffeborough
 Ravenel
 Riverland Terrace
 Rock Hill
 Seneca
 Simpsonville
 South Windermire
 Spartanburg
 St. Helena
 St. Helena Isle
 Sullivans Island
 Summerville
 Sumter
 Taylors
 Trenton
 Varnville
 Wadmalaw Island
 Walterboro
 Wando
 West Columbia
 Yemassee

South Dakota (2)  

 Rapid City
 Sioux Falls

Tennessee (248)  

 Adams
 Afton
 Alcoa
 Allardt
 Andersonville
 Antioch
 Apison
 Arlington
 Arrington
 Ashland City
 Athens
 Atoka
 Bartlett
 Bell Buckle
 Belle Meade
 Belvidere
 Benton
 Bethpage
 Blaine
 Blountville
 Bon Aqua
 Brentwood
 Briceville
 Brighton
 Bristol
 Bulls Gap
 Burlison
 Burns
 Bybee
 Byrdstown
 Carthage
 Caryville
 Cedar Hill
 Central Gardens
 Charlotte
 Chattanooga
 Cherokee Park/Richland
 Chicasaw Gardens
 Christiana
 Chuckey
 City Center
 Clarkrange
 Clarksville
 Cleveland
 Clinton
 Coalfield
 Collegedale
 Collierville
 Columbia
 Cookeville
 Cordova
 Corryton
 Cosby
 Cottontown
 Covington
 Cowan
 Cross Plains
 Crossville
 Cumberland Furn
 Dandridge
 Dayton
 Decherd
 Deer Lodge
 Delano
 Dickson
 Dowelltown
 Dunlap
 Eads
 East Ridge
 Elizabethton
 Ellendale
 Elmwood
 Englewood
 Erwin
 Estill Springs
 Etowah
 Fairfield Glad
 Fairview
 Fall Branch
 Fayetteville
 Franklin
 Friendsville
 Gallatin
 Gallaway
 Gatlinburg
 Germantown
 Goodlettsville
 Grand Junction
 Gray
 Green Hills
 Greenback
 Greenbrier
 Greeneville
 Greenville
 Grimsley
 Guys
 Hampton
 Harbor Towne Center
 Harriman
 Harrison
 Hartsville
 Hedge Hills
 Hedgemoor
 Heiskell
 Helenwood
 Hendersonville
 Hermitage
 Hillsboro Village
 Hixson
 Huntsville
 Jacksboro
 Jackson
 Jamestown
 Jefferson City
 Joelton
 Johnson City
 Jonesboro
 Jonesborough
 Kingsport
 Kingston
 Kingston Spgs
 Knox
 Knoxville
 Kodak
 La Follette
 La Vergne
 Lafayette
 Lake City
 Lakeland
 Lancing
 Lascassas
 Lavergne
 Lebanon
 Lenoir City
 Limestone
 Livingston
 Lookout Mtn
 Loudon
 Louisville
 Lundee
 Lupton City
 Luttrell
 Lyles
 Lynchburg
 Madison
 Madisonville
 Manchester
 Maryville
 Mascot
 Mason
 Maynardville
 Mcdonald
 Mcminnville
 Memphis
 Michie
 Middleton
 Midway
 Millington
 Mohawk
 Morristown
 Moscow
 Mosheim
 Mt Juliet
 Mt. Juliet
 Murfreesbo
 Nashville
 New Market
 Newport
 Niota
 Nolensville
 Normandy Meadows
 Norris
 Oak Ridge
 Oakdale
 Oakland
 Ocoee
 Old Fort
 Old Hickory
 Oliver Springs
 Oneida
 Ooltewah
 Orlinda
 Parrottsville
 Pegram
 Petros
 Pigeon Estates
 Pigeon Forge
 Piney Flats
 Pioneer
 Pleasant Acres
 Pocahontas
 Poplar Ridge Farms
 Portland
 Powell
 Readyville
 Red Bank
 Riceville
 Ridgetop
 Robbins
 Rockford
 Rockvale
 Rockwood
 Rossville
 Russellville
 Sale Creek
 Sevierville
 Seymour
 Shelbyville
 Signal Mountain
 Smithville
 Smyrna
 Soddy Daisy
 Somerville
 South Bluffs
 Sparta
 Spring Hill
 Springfield
 Springhill
 St. Nick
 Stanton
 Strawberry Plains
 Sunbright
 Sweetwater
 Sylvan Park
 Telford
 Tellico Plains
 Townsend
 Tullahoma
 Unicoi
 Vanleer
 Village
 Vonore
 Walland
 Wartburg
 Waverly
 West End/the Gulch
 West Meade
 Westmoreland
 White Bluff
 White House
 White Station
 Whites Creek
 Whitesburg
 Whiteville
 Williston
 Winchester
 Winfield
 Woodbury

Texas (290)  

 Abilene
 Acres Homes
 Addicks
 Addison
 Afton Oaks
 Aldine
 Alief
 Allen
 Almeda
 Alvin
 Amarillo
 Angleton
 Arlington
 Audubon Place
 Austin
 Avondale East
 Bacliff
 Bay Forest
 Bay Glen
 Bay Knoll
 Baytown
 Beaumont
 Bedford
 Bellaire
 Binz
 Blue Ridge
 Boerne
 Boulevard Oaks
 Braeswood Place
 Briar Meadow
 Briargrove
 Briargrove Park
 Brownsville
 Bryan
 Camden Park
 Camino South
 Candlelight Estates
 Candlelight Forest West
 Candlelight Place
 Carrollton
 Carverdale
 Cedar Park
 Channelview
 Chasewood
 Cherryhurst
 Chevy Chase
 Chinatown
 City Park
 Clear Lake City
 Cleveland
 Clinton Park
 Cloverland
 Clute
 College Station
 Colleyville
 Conroe
 Coppell
 Copperas Cove
 Copperfield
 Corinthian Pointe
 Corpus Christi
 Cottage Grove
 Courtlandt Place
 Crestwood
 Crosby
 Cypress
 Dallas
 Dayton
 Deer Park
 Denton
 Dickinson
 East Little York
 Eastex
 Eastwood
 Edgebrook
 El Dorado
 El Paso
 Eldridge
 Euless
 Fairbanks
 Fifth Ward
 Flower Mound
 Fondren Southwest
 Forest West
 Forrest Lake
 Fort Worth
 Freeport
 Frenchtown
 Fresno
 Friendswood
 Frisco
 Fulshear
 Galena Park
 Galveston
 Garden Oaks
 Garden Villas
 Garland
 Genoa Township
 Georgetown
 Glen Cove
 Glenbrook Valley
 Glenshire
 Grand Prairie
 Grapevine
 Greenway Plaza
 Greenwood
 Gulfgate
 Gulfton
 Gulfway Terrace
 Harlingen
 Harrisburg
 Heather Glen
 Herschellwood
 Hidden Valley
 Highland Village
 Highlands
 Hillwood
 Hitchcock
 Hockley
 Houston
 Houston Gardens
 Houston Heights
 Huffman
 Humble
 Hunters Glen
 Hunters Point
 Hunterwood
 Huntsville
 Idylwood
 Independence Heights
 Inwood Forest
 Irving
 Jeanetta
 Jersey Village
 Kashmere Gardens
 Katy
 Keller
 Kemah
 Kerrville
 Killeen
 Kingwood
 Kleinbrook
 Knollwood Village
 La Marque
 La Porte
 Lake Houston
 Lake Jackson
 Lakewood
 Langwood
 Larchmont
 Laredo
 Lazybrook
 League City
 Lewisville
 Liberty
 Lincoln Greens
 Lindale Park
 Linkwood
 Little Saigon
 Livingston
 Longview
 Lubbock
 Lufkin
 Magnolia
 Magnolia Grove
 Magnolia Park
 Manchester
 Mansfield
 Manvel
 Maplewood
 Marshall
 Mcallen
 Mckinney
 Memorial Park
 Mesquite
 Meyerland
 Midland
 Midtown
 Mission
 Missouri City
 Mont Belvieu
 Montgomery
 Montrose
 Moonshine Hill
 Morningside Place
 Museum District
 Mykawa
 Neartown
 Needville
 New Caney
 Norhill
 North Central
 North Lindale
 Northcliffe
 Northcliffe Manor
 Northfield
 Northline
 Northshore
 Northside
 Nottingham Forest
 Oak Brook
 Oak Brook West
 Oak Estates
 Oak Forest
 Oak Manor
 Odessa
 Old Braeswood
 Panola
 Park Place
 Pasadena
 Pearland
 Pecan Park
 Pierce Junction
 Pine Valley
 Pine Valley, Houston, Texas
 Pinehurst
 Pinemont
 Plano
 Pleasantville
 Ponderosa Forest
 Port Arthur
 Port Houston
 Porter
 Prestonwood Forest
 Recreation Acres
 Rice Military
 Rice Village
 Richardson
 Richmond
 Richwood
 Ridgegate
 Ridgemont
 River Oaks
 Riverside Terrace
 Rockwall
 Rosenberg
 Rosharon
 Round Rock
 Rowlett
 San Angelo
 San Antonio
 Santa Fe
 Seabrook
 Settegast
 Shady Acres
 Sharpstown
 Sherwood Forest
 South Bank
 South Houston
 Southampton
 Southgate
 Southlake
 Spring
 Spring Lakes
 Stafford
 Sugar Land
 Sugar Valley
 Sunnyside
 Tanglewood
 Temple
 Texarkana
 Texas City
 The Woodlands
 Timbergrove Manor
 Tomball
 Tyler
 Victoria
 Waco
 Walnut Bend
 Washington Avenue
 Waskom
 Webster
 West Eleventh Place
 West End
 Westbury
 Westmoreland
 Westmoreland Farms
 Westwood
 Wichita Falls
 Willis
 Willow Meadows
 Willowbend
 Willowbrook
 Willowood
 Windemere
 Woodland Heights
 Woodland Trails
 Woodshire
 Woodside
 Wrenwood

Utah (104)  

 Alpine
 American Fork
 Bear River City
 Bluffdale
 Bountiful
 Brigham City
 Cedar Hills
 Centerville
 Clarkston
 Clearfield
 Clinton
 Coalville
 Copperton
 Corinne
 Cottonwood Heights
 Deweyville
 Draper
 Eagle Mountain
 Elk Ridge
 Farmington
 Farr West
 Fielding
 Fruit Heights
 Garland
 Grantsville
 Harrisville
 Heber
 Heber City
 Herriman
 Highland
 Hill Afb
 Holladay
 Honeyville
 Hooper
 Hyde Park
 Hyrum
 Kaysville
 Kearns
 Layton
 Lehi
 Lewiston
 Lindon
 Logan
 Magna
 Mapleton
 Mendon
 Midvale
 Midway
 Millville
 Morgan
 Mountain Green
 Murray
 Nephi
 Newton
 Nibley
 North Logan
 North Ogden
 North Salt Lake
 Ogden
 Orem
 Paradise
 Park City
 Payson
 Perry
 Plain City
 Pleasant Grove
 Pleasant View
 Plymouth
 Providence
 Provo
 Richmond
 River Heights
 Riverdale
 Riverside
 Riverton
 Roy
 Saint George
 Salem
 Salt Lake City
 Sandy
 Saratoga Springs
 Smithfield
 South Jordan
 South Ogden
 South Weber
 Spanish Fork
 Springville
 Stansbury Park
 Sunset
 Syracuse
 Taylorsville
 Tooele
 Tremonton
 Uintah
 Washington Terrace
 Wellsville
 West Bountiful
 West Haven
 West Jordan
 West Point
 West Valley
 West Valley City
 Willard
 Woods Cross

Vermont (149)  

 Arlington
 Ascutney
 Athens
 Bakersfield
 Barre
 Barton
 Bellows Falls
 Belmont
 Bennington
 Berlin
 Bethel
 Bomoseen
 Bondville
 Brandon
 Brattleboro
 Bridgewater
 Bristol
 Brownington
 Brownsville
 Burlington
 Calais
 Castleton
 Cavendish
 Charlotte
 Chester
 Chittenden
 Colchester
 Coventry
 Danby
 Derby
 Derby Line
 Dorset
 Duxbury
 East Fairfield
 East Hardwick
 East Montpelier
 Enosburg Falls
 Essex
 Essex Junction
 Fair Haven
 Fairfax
 Ferrisburg
 Florence
 Forest Dale
 Georgia
 Glover
 Grafton
 Guilford
 Hardwick
 Hartford
 Hartland
 Highgate Center
 Hinesburg
 Huntington
 Hyde Park
 Hydeville
 Irasburg
 Island Pond
 Jay
 Jericho
 Johnson
 Killington
 Leicester
 Lincoln
 Londonderry
 Ludlow
 Manchester
 Manchester Center
 Mendon
 Middlebury
 Middlesex
 Middletown Springs
 Milton
 Monkton
 Montgomery Center
 Montpelier
 Morgan
 Morrisville
 Mount Holly
 New Haven
 Newport
 Newport Center
 North Chittenden
 North Clarendon
 North Pownal
 Norwich
 Orleans
 Pawlet
 Perkinsville
 Peru
 Pittsford
 Plainfield
 Plymouth
 Poultney
 Pownal
 Proctor
 Proctorsville
 Putney
 Quechee
 Randolph
 Randolph Center
 Reading
 Richford
 Richmond
 Rochester
 Rockingham
 Rutland
 Saint Albans
 Saint George
 Saxtons River
 Shaftsbury
 Shelburne
 Sheldon
 Shrewsbury
 South Burlington
 South Hero
 Springfield
 Starksboro
 Stowe
 Stratton
 Stratton Mountain
 Sunderland
 Swanton
 Tinmouth
 Troy
 Underhill
 Vergennes
 Vernon
 Wallingford
 Waterbury
 Waterbury Center
 Weathersfield
 Wells
 West Pawlet
 West Rutland
 West Windsor
 Westfield
 Westford
 Westminster
 Weston
 White River Junction
 Wilder
 Williston
 Windsor
 Winooski
 Woodbury
 Woodford
 Woodstock
 Worcester

Virginia (326)  

 Abingdon
 Aldie
 Alexandria
 Altavista
 Alton
 Amelia
 Amherst
 Amissville
 Annandale
 Appalachia
 Arlington
 Aroda
 Arvonia
 Ashburn
 Ashland
 Atkins
 Austinville
 Axton
 Aylett
 Barboursville
 Bassett
 Bealeton
 Beaverdam
 Bedford
 Ben Hur
 Bentonville
 Berryville
 Big Stone Gap
 Blacksburg
 Blairs
 Blue Ridge
 Bluefield
 Bluemont
 Boissevain
 Boston
 Boyce
 Boydton
 Brandy Station
 Bremo Bluff
 Bridgewater
 Brightwood
 Bristol
 Bristow
 Broad Run
 Broadway
 Brookneal
 Buckingham
 Buena Vista
 Bumpass
 Burgess
 Burke
 Callao
 Cascade
 Catawba
 Catharpin
 Catlett
 Centerville
 Centreville
 Chantilly
 Charles City
 Charlottesville
 Chase City
 Chatham
 Chesapeake
 Chester
 Chester Gap
 Chesterfield
 Chilhowie
 Christiansburg
 Churchville
 Clearbrook
 Clifton
 Clinchco
 Clintwood
 Cloverdale
 Cobbs Creek
 Coeburn
 Coles Point
 Collinsville
 Colonial
 Colonial Beach
 Craigsville
 Crimora
 Cross Junction
 Crozet
 Crozier
 Culpeper
 Dale City
 Daleville
 Danville
 Dayton
 Dewitt
 Dillwyn
 Dinwiddie
 Disputanta
 Draper
 Dry Fork
 Dryden
 Dublin
 Duffield
 Dulles
 Dumfries
 Earlysville
 Elkton
 Elliston
 Emory
 Emporia
 Fairfax
 Fairfax Station
 Falls Church
 Falls Mills
 Falmouth
 Fieldale
 Fincastle
 Fishersville
 Flint Hill
 Forest
 Fork Union
 Fort Belvoir
 Fort Lee
 Fort Myer
 Fredericksburg
 Fries
 Front Royal
 Gainesville
 Galax
 Garrisonville
 Glade Spring
 Glasgow
 Glen Allen
 Gloucester
 Goochland
 Goodview
 Gordonsville
 Gore
 Goshen
 Great Falls
 Gretna
 Grottoes
 Gum Spring
 Hague
 Halifax
 Hamilton
 Hampton
 Hanover
 Hardy
 Harrisonburg
 Haymarket
 Heathsville
 Henrico
 Herndon
 Highland Springs
 Hillsville
 Hinton
 Hopewell
 Hot Springs
 Huddleston
 Hudgins
 Hurt
 Independence
 Ivy
 Jeffersonton
 Jetersville
 Jonesville
 Keezletown
 Keokee
 Keswick
 Kilmarnock
 King George
 King William
 Kinsale
 Lacrosse
 Lafayette
 Leesburg
 Lexington
 Linden
 Linville
 Locust Grove
 Lorton
 Lottsburg
 Louisa
 Lovettsville
 Luray
 Lynchburg
 Lyndhurst
 Madison
 Madison Height
 Madison Heights
 Maidens
 Manakin Sabot
 Manassas
 Manassas Park
 Marion
 Marshall
 Martinsburg
 Martinsville
 Mathews
 Mcgaheysville
 Mckenney
 Mclean
 Meadowview
 Mechanicsville
 Middleburg
 Middletown
 Midland
 Midlothian
 Mineral
 Moneta
 Monroe
 Montross
 Montvale
 Moseley
 Mount Sidney
 Mt Crawford
 Natural Bridge
 New Canton
 Newbern
 Newport News
 Nokesville
 Norfolk
 North Tazewell
 Norton
 Oak Hill
 Oakton
 Occoquan
 Orange
 Palmyra
 Partlow
 Patrick Springs
 Penn Laird
 Pennington Gap
 Petersburg
 Pocahontas
 Port Haywood
 Port Republic
 Portsmouth
 Potomac Falls
 Pound
 Powhatan
 Prince George
 Providence Forge
 Pulaski
 Purcellville
 Quantico
 Quinton
 Radford
 Raphine
 Reedville
 Remington
 Reston
 Reva
 Rhoadesville
 Richmond
 Ridgeway
 Ringgold
 Rixeyville
 Roanoke
 Rockville
 Rocky Gap
 Rocky Mount
 Round Hill
 Ruckersville
 Rustburg
 Ruther Glen
 Salem
 Saltville
 Sandston
 Sandy Hook
 Scottsville
 Shawsville
 Shenandoah
 Singers Glenn
 South Boston
 South Hill
 South Riding
 Spencer
 Sperryville
 Spotyslvania
 Springfield
 Stafford
 Stanardsville
 Stanley
 Stanleytown
 Staunton
 Stephens City
 Stephenson
 Sterling
 Strasburg
 Stuart
 Stuarts Draft
 Suffolk
 Sugar Grove
 Sutherland
 Sutherlin
 Swoope
 Thaxton
 The Plains
 Thornburg
 Timberville
 Triangle
 Troutville
 Troy
 Unionville
 Verona
 Victoria
 Vienna
 Vinton
 Virginia Beach
 Warm Springs
 Warrenton
 Warsaw
 Washington
 Waterford
 Waynesboro
 Weyers Cave
 White Post
 Williamsburg
 Winchester
 Wise
 Woodbridge
 Woodford
 Woodlawn
 Woodridge
 Woodstock
 Wytheville
 Yorktown

Washington (202)  

 Aberdeen
 Airway Heights
 Algona
 Anacortes
 Arlington
 Auburn
 Bainbridge Island
 Battle Ground
 Beaux Arts
 Belfair
 Bellevue
 Bellingham
 Black Diamond
 Blaine
 Bonney Lake
 Bothell
 Bremerton
 Brier
 Brush Prairie
 Buckley
 Burien
 Burlington
 Burton
 Camano Island
 Camas
 Carbonado
 Carnation
 Castle Rock
 Centralia
 Chehalis
 Cheney
 Clinton
 Clyde Hill
 Colbert
 Cosmopolis
 Coupeville
 Covington
 Custer
 Deer Park
 Deming
 Des Moines
 Dupont
 Duvall
 East Olympia
 Eatonville
 Edgewood
 Edmonds
 Elma
 Enumclaw
 Everett
 Everson
 Fairchild Afb
 Fall City
 Federal Way
 Ferndale
 Fife
 Fircrest
 Fort Lewis
 Fox Island
 Freeland
 Gig Harbor
 Gold Bar
 Graham
 Granite Falls
 Grayland
 Greenacres
 Hansville
 Hobart
 Hoquiam
 Huntington
 Hunts Point
 Indianola
 Issaquah
 Kalama
 Kelso
 Kenmore
 Kent
 Kingston
 Kirkland
 La Center
 Lacey
 Lake Forest Park
 Lake Stevens
 Lake Tapps
 Lakebay
 Lakewood
 Langley
 Liberty Lake
 Longview
 Lynden
 Lynnwood
 Maple Falls
 Maple Valley
 Marysville
 Mcchord
 Mcchord Afb
 Mccleary
 Mckenna
 Mead
 Medical Lake
 Medina
 Mercer Island
 Mill Creek
 Milton
 Mineral
 Monroe
 Montesano
 Morgantown
 Mossyrock
 Mount Vernon
 Mountlake Terrace
 Mukilteo
 Newcastle
 Newman Lake
 Nine Mile Falls
 Nooksack
 Normandy Park
 North Bend
 Oak Harbor
 Oakville
 Ocean Shores
 Olympia
 Orting
 Otis Orchards
 Pacific
 Parkland
 Port Gamble
 Port Orchard
 Port Townsend
 Poulsbo
 Preston
 Puyallup
 Rainier
 Ravensdale
 Raymond
 Redmond
 Renton
 Ridgefield
 Rochester
 Roy
 Ruston
 Ryderwood
 Sammamish
 Satsop
 Seahurst
 Seatac
 Seattle
 Sedro Woolley
 Sequim
 Shelton
 Shoreline
 Silverdale
 Silverlake
 Snohomish
 Snoqualmie
 South Bend
 South Prairie
 Spanaway
 Spokane
 Spokane Valley
 Startup
 Steilacoom
 Sultan
 Sumner
 Suquamish
 Tacoma
 Tenino
 Tokeland
 Toutle
 Tracyton
 Tukwila
 Tulalip
 Tumwater
 University Place
 Vancouver
 Vashon
 Vashon Island
 Vaughn
 Veradale
 Washougal
 Wauna
 Westport
 Wilkeson
 Winlock
 Woodinville
 Woodland
 Woodway
 Yarrow Point
 Yelm

West Virginia (86)  

 Albright
 Augusta
 Bancroft
 Barboursville
 Beckley
 Benwood
 Berkeley Spgs
 Bethany
 Bluefield
 Bramwell
 Brandonville
 Bridgeport
 Bruceton Mills
 Buffalo
 Bunker Hill
 Carolina
 Cassville
 Charles Town
 Charleston
 Chester
 Clarksburg
 Colliers
 Core
 Dellslow
 Eleanor
 Fairmont
 Falling Waters
 Farmington
 Follansbee
 Freeman
 Gerrardstown
 Glen Dale
 Grafton
 Granville
 Great Cacapon
 Harpers Ferry
 Hedgesville
 Hometown
 Huntington
 Hurricane
 Inwood
 Kearneysville
 Keyser
 Lesage
 Maidsville
 Mannington
 Martinsburg
 Mcmechen
 Monongah
 Montcalm
 Morgantown
 Moundsville
 New Creek
 New Cumberland
 New Manchester
 Newell
 Nitro
 Ona
 Osage
 Parkersburg
 Piedmont
 Poca
 Princeton
 Pursglove
 Rachel
 Ranson
 Red House
 Rivesville
 Rock
 Rowlesburg
 Saint Albans
 Scott Depot
 Shenandoah
 Shepherdstown
 Star City
 Summit Point
 Thornton
 Triadelphia
 Valley Grove
 Weirton
 Wellsburg
 West Liberty
 Westover
 Wheeling
 Winfield
 Worthington

Wisconsin (37)  

 Appleton
 Beloit
 Brookfield
 Burlington
 De Pere
 Eau Claire
 Green Bay
 Hartland
 Hudson
 Janesville
 Kenosha
 La Crosse
 Lake Geneva
 Madison
 Manitowoc
 Menomonee Falls
 Mequon
 Middleton
 Milwaukee
 Neenah
 New Berlin
 New Richmond
 Oconomowoc
 Oshkosh
 Pewaukee
 Pleasant Prairie
 Prescott
 Racine
 River Falls
 Sheboygan
 Sturgeon Bay
 Two Rivers
 Watertown
 Waukesha
 Wausau
 Wauwatosa
 Whitelaw

Wyoming (5)  

 Casper
 Cheyenne
 Gillette
 Jackson
 Laramie

Notes

1. Alabama markets
2. Alaska markets
3. Arizona markets
4. Arkansas markets
5. California markets
6. Colorado markets
7. Connecticut markets
8. Delaware markets
9. District of Columbia markets
10. Florida markets
11. Georgia markets
12. Idaho markets
13. Illinois markets
14. Indiana markets
15. Iowa markets
16. Kansas markets
17. Kentucky markets
18. Louisiana markets
19. Maine markets
20. Maryland markets
21. Massachusetts markets
22. Michigan markets
23. Minnesota markets
24. Mississippi markets
25. Missouri markets
26. Montana markets
27. Nebraska markets
28. Nevada markets
29. New Hampshire markets
30. New Jersey markets
31. New Mexico markets
32. New York markets
33. North Carolina markets
34. North Dakota markets
35. Ohio markets
36. Oklahoma markets
37. Oregon markets
38. Pennsylvania markets
39. Rhode Island markets
40. South Carolina markets
41. South Dakota markets
42. Tennessee markets
43. Texas markets
44. Utah markets
45. Vermont markets
46. Virginia markets
47. Washington markets
48. West Virginia markets
49. Wisconsin markets
50. Wyoming markets

References

External links
 XFINITY® Services from Comcast In My Area, Comcast
 

Comcast